This is the list of the 1858 isomers of tetradecane.

Straight Chain
 Tetradecane

With tridecane backbone

 2-Methyltridecane
 3-Methyltridecane
 4-Methyltridecane
 5-Methyltridecane
 6-Methyltridecane
 7-Methyltridecane

With dodecane backbone

Dimethyl

 2,2-Dimethyldodecane
 2,3-Dimethyldodecane
 2,4-Dimethyldodecane
 2,5-Dimethyldodecane
 2,6-Dimethyldodecane
 2,7-Dimethyldodecane
 2,8-Dimethyldodecane
 2,9-Dimethyldodecane
 2,10-Dimethyldodecane
 2,11-Dimethyldodecane
 3,3-Dimethyldodecane
 3,4-Dimethyldodecane
 3,5-Dimethyldodecane
 3,6-Dimethyldodecane
 3,7-Dimethyldodecane
 3,8-Dimethyldodecane
 3,9-Dimethyldodecane
 3,10-Dimethyldodecane
 4,4-Dimethyldodecane
 4,5-Dimethyldodecane
 4,6-Dimethyldodecane
 4,7-Dimethyldodecane
 4,8-Dimethyldodecane
 4,9-Dimethyldodecane
 5,5-Dimethyldodecane
 5,6-Dimethyldodecane
 5,7-Dimethyldodecane
 5,8-Dimethyldodecane
 6,6-Dimethyldodecane
 6,7-Dimethyldodecane

Ethyl

 3-Ethyldodecane
 4-Ethyldodecane
 5-Ethyldodecane
 6-Ethyldodecane

With undecane backbone

Trimethyl

 2,2,3-Trimethylundecane
 2,2,4-Trimethylundecane
 2,2,5-Trimethylundecane
 2,2,6-Trimethylundecane
 2,2,7-Trimethylundecane
 2,2,8-Trimethylundecane
 2,2,9-Trimethylundecane
 2,2,10-Trimethylundecane
 2,3,3-Trimethylundecane
 2,3,4-Trimethylundecane
 2,3,5-Trimethylundecane
 2,3,6-Trimethylundecane
 2,3,7-Trimethylundecane
 2,3,8-Trimethylundecane
 2,3,9-Trimethylundecane
 2,3,10-Trimethylundecane
 2,4,4-Trimethylundecane
 2,4,5-Trimethylundecane
 2,4,6-Trimethylundecane
 2,4,7-Trimethylundecane
 2,4,8-Trimethylundecane
 2,4,9-Trimethylundecane
 2,4,10-Trimethylundecane
 2,5,5-Trimethylundecane
 2,5,6-Trimethylundecane
 2,5,7-Trimethylundecane
 2,5,8-Trimethylundecane
 2,5,9-Trimethylundecane
 2,5,10-Trimethylundecane
 2,6,6-Trimethylundecane
 2,6,7-Trimethylundecane
 2,6,8-Trimethylundecane
 2,6,9-Trimethylundecane
 2,6,10-Trimethylundecane
 2,7,7-Trimethylundecane
 2,7,8-Trimethylundecane
 2,7,9-Trimethylundecane
 2,8,8-Trimethylundecane
 2,8,9-Trimethylundecane
 2,9,9-Trimethylundecane
 3,3,4-Trimethylundecane
 3,3,5-Trimethylundecane
 3,3,6-Trimethylundecane
 3,3,7-Trimethylundecane
 3,3,8-Trimethylundecane
 3,3,9-Trimethylundecane
 3,4,4-Trimethylundecane
 3,4,5-Trimethylundecane
 3,4,6-Trimethylundecane
 3,4,7-Trimethylundecane
 3,4,8-Trimethylundecane
 3,4,9-Trimethylundecane
 3,5,5-Trimethylundecane
 3,5,6-Trimethylundecane
 3,5,7-Trimethylundecane
 3,5,8-Trimethylundecane
 3,5,9-Trimethylundecane
 3,6,6-Trimethylundecane
 3,6,7-Trimethylundecane
 3,6,8-Trimethylundecane
 3,6,9-Trimethylundecane
 3,7,7-Trimethylundecane
 3,7,8-Trimethylundecane
 3,8,8-Trimethylundecane
 4,4,5-Trimethylundecane
 4,4,6-Trimethylundecane
 4,4,7-Trimethylundecane
 4,4,8-Trimethylundecane
 4,5,5-Trimethylundecane
 4,5,6-Trimethylundecane
 4,5,7-Trimethylundecane
 4,5,8-Trimethylundecane
 4,6,6-Trimethylundecane
 4,6,7-Trimethylundecane
 4,6,8-Trimethylundecane
 4,7,7-Trimethylundecane
 5,5,6-Trimethylundecane
 5,5,7-Trimethylundecane
 5,6,6-Trimethylundecane
 5,6,7-Trimethylundecane

Ethyl+Methyl

 3-Ethyl-2-methylundecane
 3-Ethyl-3-methylundecane
 3-Ethyl-4-methylundecane
 3-Ethyl-5-methylundecane
 3-Ethyl-6-methylundecane
 3-Ethyl-7-methylundecane
 3-Ethyl-8-methylundecane
 3-Ethyl-9-methylundecane
 4-Ethyl-2-methylundecane
 4-Ethyl-3-methylundecane
 4-Ethyl-4-methylundecane
 4-Ethyl-5-methylundecane
 4-Ethyl-6-methylundecane
 4-Ethyl-7-methylundecane
 4-Ethyl-8-methylundecane
 5-Ethyl-2-methylundecane
 5-Ethyl-3-methylundecane
 5-Ethyl-4-methylundecane
 5-Ethyl-5-methylundecane
 5-Ethyl-6-methylundecane
 5-Ethyl-7-methylundecane
 6-Ethyl-2-methylundecane
 6-Ethyl-3-methylundecane
 6-Ethyl-4-methylundecane
 6-Ethyl-5-methylundecane
 6-Ethyl-6-methylundecane
 7-Ethyl-2-methylundecane
 7-Ethyl-3-methylundecane
 7-Ethyl-4-methylundecane
 8-Ethyl-2-methylundecane
 8-Ethyl-3-methylundecane
 9-Ethyl-2-methylundecane

Propyl

 4-Propylundecane
 5-Propylundecane
 6-Propylundecane
 4-(1-Methylethyl)undecane
 5-(1-Methylethyl)undecane
 6-(1-Methylethyl)undecane

With decane backbone

Tetramethyl

 2,2,3,3-Tetramethyldecane
 2,2,3,4-Tetramethyldecane
 2,2,3,5-Tetramethyldecane
 2,2,3,6-Tetramethyldecane
 2,2,3,7-Tetramethyldecane
 2,2,3,8-Tetramethyldecane
 2,2,3,9-Tetramethyldecane
 2,2,4,4-Tetramethyldecane
 2,2,4,5-Tetramethyldecane
 2,2,4,6-Tetramethyldecane
 2,2,4,7-Tetramethyldecane
 2,2,4,8-Tetramethyldecane
 2,2,4,9-Tetramethyldecane
 2,2,5,5-Tetramethyldecane
 2,2,5,6-Tetramethyldecane
 2,2,5,7-Tetramethyldecane
 2,2,5,8-Tetramethyldecane
 2,2,5,9-Tetramethyldecane
 2,2,6,6-Tetramethyldecane
 2,2,6,7-Tetramethyldecane
 2,2,6,8-Tetramethyldecane
 2,2,6,9-Tetramethyldecane
 2,2,7,7-Tetramethyldecane
 2,2,7,8-Tetramethyldecane
 2,2,7,9-Tetramethyldecane
 2,2,8,8-Tetramethyldecane
 2,2,8,9-Tetramethyldecane
 2,2,9,9-Tetramethyldecane
 2,3,3,4-Tetramethyldecane
 2,3,3,5-Tetramethyldecane
 2,3,3,6-Tetramethyldecane
 2,3,3,7-Tetramethyldecane
 2,3,3,8-Tetramethyldecane
 2,3,3,9-Tetramethyldecane
 2,3,4,4-Tetramethyldecane
 2,3,4,5-Tetramethyldecane
 2,3,4,6-Tetramethyldecane
 2,3,4,7-Tetramethyldecane
 2,3,4,8-Tetramethyldecane
 2,3,4,9-Tetramethyldecane
 2,3,5,5-Tetramethyldecane
 2,3,5,6-Tetramethyldecane
 2,3,5,7-Tetramethyldecane
 2,3,5,8-Tetramethyldecane
 2,3,5,9-Tetramethyldecane
 2,3,6,6-Tetramethyldecane
 2,3,6,7-Tetramethyldecane
 2,3,6,8-Tetramethyldecane
 2,3,6,9-Tetramethyldecane
 2,3,7,7-Tetramethyldecane
 2,3,7,8-Tetramethyldecane
 2,3,7,9-Tetramethyldecane
 2,3,8,8-Tetramethyldecane
 2,3,8,9-Tetramethyldecane
 2,4,4,5-Tetramethyldecane
 2,4,4,6-Tetramethyldecane
 2,4,4,7-Tetramethyldecane
 2,4,4,8-Tetramethyldecane
 2,4,4,9-Tetramethyldecane
 2,4,5,5-Tetramethyldecane
 2,4,5,6-Tetramethyldecane
 2,4,5,7-Tetramethyldecane
 2,4,5,8-Tetramethyldecane
 2,4,5,9-Tetramethyldecane
 2,4,6,6-Tetramethyldecane
 2,4,6,7-Tetramethyldecane
 2,4,6,8-Tetramethyldecane
 2,4,6,9-Tetramethyldecane
 2,4,7,7-Tetramethyldecane
 2,4,7,8-Tetramethyldecane
 2,4,7,9-Tetramethyldecane
 2,4,8,8-Tetramethyldecane
 2,5,5,6-Tetramethyldecane
 2,5,5,7-Tetramethyldecane
 2,5,5,8-Tetramethyldecane
 2,5,5,9-Tetramethyldecane
 2,5,6,6-Tetramethyldecane
 2,5,6,7-Tetramethyldecane
 2,5,6,8-Tetramethyldecane
 2,5,6,9-Tetramethyldecane
 2,5,7,7-Tetramethyldecane
 2,5,7,8-Tetramethyldecane
 2,5,8,8-Tetramethyldecane
 2,6,6,7-Tetramethyldecane
 2,6,6,8-Tetramethyldecane
 2,6,7,7-Tetramethyldecane
 2,6,7,8-Tetramethyldecane
 2,6,8,8-Tetramethyldecane
 2,7,7,8-Tetramethyldecane
 2,7,8,8-Tetramethyldecane
 3,3,4,4-Tetramethyldecane
 3,3,4,5-Tetramethyldecane
 3,3,4,6-Tetramethyldecane
 3,3,4,7-Tetramethyldecane
 3,3,4,8-Tetramethyldecane
 3,3,5,5-Tetramethyldecane
 3,3,5,6-Tetramethyldecane
 3,3,5,7-Tetramethyldecane
 3,3,5,8-Tetramethyldecane
 3,3,6,6-Tetramethyldecane
 3,3,6,7-Tetramethyldecane
 3,3,6,8-Tetramethyldecane
 3,3,7,7-Tetramethyldecane
 3,3,7,8-Tetramethyldecane
 3,3,8,8-Tetramethyldecane
 3,4,4,5-Tetramethyldecane
 3,4,4,6-Tetramethyldecane
 3,4,4,7-Tetramethyldecane
 3,4,4,8-Tetramethyldecane
 3,4,5,5-Tetramethyldecane
 3,4,5,6-Tetramethyldecane
 3,4,5,7-Tetramethyldecane
 3,4,5,8-Tetramethyldecane
 3,4,6,6-Tetramethyldecane
 3,4,6,7-Tetramethyldecane
 3,4,6,8-Tetramethyldecane
 3,4,7,7-Tetramethyldecane
 3,4,7,8-Tetramethyldecane
 3,5,5,6-Tetramethyldecane
 3,5,5,7-Tetramethyldecane
 3,5,5,8-Tetramethyldecane
 3,5,6,6-Tetramethyldecane
 3,5,6,7-Tetramethyldecane
 3,5,6,8-Tetramethyldecane
 3,5,7,7-Tetramethyldecane
 3,6,6,7-Tetramethyldecane
 3,6,7,7-Tetramethyldecane
 4,4,5,5-Tetramethyldecane
 4,4,5,6-Tetramethyldecane
 4,4,5,7-Tetramethyldecane
 4,4,6,6-Tetramethyldecane
 4,4,6,7-Tetramethyldecane
 4,4,7,7-Tetramethyldecane
 4,5,5,6-Tetramethyldecane
 4,5,5,7-Tetramethyldecane
 4,5,6,6-Tetramethyldecane
 4,5,6,7-Tetramethyldecane
 5,5,6,6-Tetramethyldecane

Ethyl+Dimethyl

 3-Ethyl-2,2-dimethyldecane
 3-Ethyl-2,3-dimethyldecane
 3-Ethyl-2,4-dimethyldecane
 3-Ethyl-2,5-dimethyldecane
 3-Ethyl-2,6-dimethyldecane
 3-Ethyl-2,7-dimethyldecane
 3-Ethyl-2,8-dimethyldecane
 3-Ethyl-2,9-dimethyldecane
 3-Ethyl-3,4-dimethyldecane
 3-Ethyl-3,5-dimethyldecane
 3-Ethyl-3,6-dimethyldecane
 3-Ethyl-3,7-dimethyldecane
 3-Ethyl-3,8-dimethyldecane
 3-Ethyl-4,4-dimethyldecane
 3-Ethyl-4,5-dimethyldecane
 3-Ethyl-4,6-dimethyldecane
 3-Ethyl-4,7-dimethyldecane
 3-Ethyl-4,8-dimethyldecane
 3-Ethyl-5,5-dimethyldecane
 3-Ethyl-5,6-dimethyldecane
 3-Ethyl-5,7-dimethyldecane
 3-Ethyl-5,8-dimethyldecane
 3-Ethyl-6,6-dimethyldecane
 3-Ethyl-6,7-dimethyldecane
 3-Ethyl-7,7-dimethyldecane
 4-Ethyl-2,2-dimethyldecane
 4-Ethyl-2,3-dimethyldecane
 4-Ethyl-2,4-dimethyldecane
 4-Ethyl-2,5-dimethyldecane
 4-Ethyl-2,6-dimethyldecane
 4-Ethyl-2,7-dimethyldecane
 4-Ethyl-2,8-dimethyldecane
 4-Ethyl-2,9-dimethyldecane
 4-Ethyl-3,3-dimethyldecane
 4-Ethyl-3,4-dimethyldecane
 4-Ethyl-3,5-dimethyldecane
 4-Ethyl-3,6-dimethyldecane
 4-Ethyl-3,7-dimethyldecane
 4-Ethyl-3,8-dimethyldecane
 4-Ethyl-4,5-dimethyldecane
 4-Ethyl-4,6-dimethyldecane
 4-Ethyl-4,7-dimethyldecane
 4-Ethyl-5,5-dimethyldecane
 4-Ethyl-5,6-dimethyldecane
 4-Ethyl-5,7-dimethyldecane
 4-Ethyl-6,6-dimethyldecane
 5-Ethyl-2,2-dimethyldecane
 5-Ethyl-2,3-dimethyldecane
 5-Ethyl-2,4-dimethyldecane
 5-Ethyl-2,5-dimethyldecane
 5-Ethyl-2,6-dimethyldecane
 5-Ethyl-2,7-dimethyldecane
 5-Ethyl-2,8-dimethyldecane
 5-Ethyl-2,9-dimethyldecane
 5-Ethyl-3,3-dimethyldecane
 5-Ethyl-3,4-dimethyldecane
 5-Ethyl-3,5-dimethyldecane
 5-Ethyl-3,6-dimethyldecane
 5-Ethyl-3,7-dimethyldecane
 5-Ethyl-3,8-dimethyldecane
 5-Ethyl-4,4-dimethyldecane
 5-Ethyl-4,5-dimethyldecane
 5-Ethyl-4,6-dimethyldecane
 5-Ethyl-4,7-dimethyldecane
 5-Ethyl-5,6-dimethyldecane
 6-Ethyl-2,2-dimethyldecane
 6-Ethyl-2,3-dimethyldecane
 6-Ethyl-2,4-dimethyldecane
 6-Ethyl-2,5-dimethyldecane
 6-Ethyl-2,6-dimethyldecane
 6-Ethyl-2,7-dimethyldecane
 6-Ethyl-2,8-dimethyldecane
 6-Ethyl-3,3-dimethyldecane
 6-Ethyl-3,4-dimethyldecane
 6-Ethyl-3,5-dimethyldecane
 6-Ethyl-3,6-dimethyldecane
 6-Ethyl-3,7-dimethyldecane
 6-Ethyl-4,4-dimethyldecane
 6-Ethyl-4,5-dimethyldecane
 6-Ethyl-4,6-dimethyldecane
 6-Ethyl-5,5-dimethyldecane
 7-Ethyl-2,2-dimethyldecane
 7-Ethyl-2,3-dimethyldecane
 7-Ethyl-2,4-dimethyldecane
 7-Ethyl-2,5-dimethyldecane
 7-Ethyl-2,6-dimethyldecane
 7-Ethyl-2,7-dimethyldecane
 7-Ethyl-2,8-dimethyldecane
 7-Ethyl-3,3-dimethyldecane
 7-Ethyl-3,4-dimethyldecane
 7-Ethyl-3,5-dimethyldecane
 7-Ethyl-3,6-dimethyldecane
 7-Ethyl-3,7-dimethyldecane
 7-Ethyl-4,4-dimethyldecane
 7-Ethyl-4,5-dimethyldecane
 8-Ethyl-2,2-dimethyldecane
 8-Ethyl-2,3-dimethyldecane
 8-Ethyl-2,4-dimethyldecane
 8-Ethyl-2,5-dimethyldecane
 8-Ethyl-2,6-dimethyldecane
 8-Ethyl-2,7-dimethyldecane
 8-Ethyl-2,8-dimethyldecane
 8-Ethyl-3,3-dimethyldecane
 8-Ethyl-3,4-dimethyldecane
 8-Ethyl-3,5-dimethyldecane

Diethyl

 3,3-Diethyldecane
 3,4-Diethyldecane
 3,5-Diethyldecane
 3,6-Diethyldecane
 3,7-Diethyldecane
 3,8-Diethyldecane
 4,4-Diethyldecane
 4,5-Diethyldecane
 4,6-Diethyldecane
 4,7-Diethyldecane
 5,5-Diethyldecane
 5,6-Diethyldecane

Methyl+Propyl

 2-Methyl-4-propyldecane
 3-Methyl-4-propyldecane
 4-Methyl-4-propyldecane
 5-Methyl-4-propyldecane
 6-Methyl-4-propyldecane
 7-Methyl-4-propyldecane
 2-Methyl-5-propyldecane
 3-Methyl-5-propyldecane
 4-Methyl-5-propyldecane
 5-Methyl-5-propyldecane
 6-Methyl-5-propyldecane
 2-Methyl-6-propyldecane
 3-Methyl-6-propyldecane
 4-Methyl-6-propyldecane
 2-Methyl-7-propyldecane
 3-Methyl-7-propyldecane
 2-Methyl-3-(1-methylethyl)decane
 2-Methyl-4-(1-methylethyl)decane
 3-Methyl-4-(1-methylethyl)decane
 4-Methyl-4-(1-methylethyl)decane
 5-Methyl-4-(1-methylethyl)decane
 6-Methyl-4-(1-methylethyl)decane
 7-Methyl-4-(1-methylethyl)decane
 2-Methyl-5-(1-methylethyl)decane
 3-Methyl-5-(1-methylethyl)decane
 4-Methyl-5-(1-methylethyl)decane
 5-Methyl-5-(1-methylethyl)decane
 6-Methyl-5-(1-methylethyl)decane
 2-Methyl-6-(1-methylethyl)decane
 3-Methyl-6-(1-methylethyl)decane
 4-Methyl-6-(1-methylethyl)decane
 2-Methyl-7-(1-methylethyl)decane
 3 3-Methyl-7-(1-methylethyl)decane

Butyl

 5-Butyldecane
 5-(1-Methylpropyl)decane
 5-(2-Methylpropyl)decane
 4-(1,1-Dimethylethyl)decane
 5-(1,1-Dimethylethyl)decane

With nonane backbone

Pentamethyl

 2,2,3,3,4-Pentamethylnonane
 2,2,3,3,5-Pentamethylnonane
 2,2,3,3,6-Pentamethylnonane
 2,2,3,3,7-Pentamethylnonane
 2,2,3,3,8-Pentamethylnonane
 2,2,3,4,4-Pentamethylnonane
 2,2,3,4,5-Pentamethylnonane
 2,2,3,4,6-Pentamethylnonane
 2,2,3,4,7-Pentamethylnonane
 2,2,3,4,8-Pentamethylnonane
 2,2,3,5,5-Pentamethylnonane
 2,2,3,5,6-Pentamethylnonane
 2,2,3,5,7-Pentamethylnonane
 2,2,3,5,8-Pentamethylnonane
 2,2,3,6,6-Pentamethylnonane
 2,2,3,6,7-Pentamethylnonane
 2,2,3,6,8-Pentamethylnonane
 2,2,3,7,7-Pentamethylnonane
 2,2,3,7,8-Pentamethylnonane
 2,2,3,8,8-Pentamethylnonane
 2,2,4,4,5-Pentamethylnonane
 2,2,4,4,6-Pentamethylnonane
 2,2,4,4,7-Pentamethylnonane
 2,2,4,4,8-Pentamethylnonane
 2,2,4,5,5-Pentamethylnonane
 2,2,4,5,6-Pentamethylnonane
 2,2,4,5,7-Pentamethylnonane
 2,2,4,5,8-Pentamethylnonane
 2,2,4,6,6-Pentamethylnonane
 2,2,4,6,7-Pentamethylnonane
 2,2,4,6,8-Pentamethylnonane
 2,2,4,7,7-Pentamethylnonane
 2,2,4,7,8-Pentamethylnonane
 2,2,4,8,8-Pentamethylnonane
 2,2,5,5,6-Pentamethylnonane
 2,2,5,5,7-Pentamethylnonane
 2,2,5,5,8-Pentamethylnonane
 2,2,5,6,6-Pentamethylnonane
 2,2,5,6,7-Pentamethylnonane
 2,2,5,6,8-Pentamethylnonane
 2,2,5,7,7-Pentamethylnonane
 2,2,5,7,8-Pentamethylnonane
 2,2,5,8,8-Pentamethylnonane
 2,2,6,6,7-Pentamethylnonane
 2,2,6,6,8-Pentamethylnonane
 2,2,6,7,7-Pentamethylnonane
 2,2,6,7,8-Pentamethylnonane
 2,2,7,7,8-Pentamethylnonane
 2,3,3,4,4-Pentamethylnonane
 2,3,3,4,5-Pentamethylnonane
 2,3,3,4,6-Pentamethylnonane
 2,3,3,4,7-Pentamethylnonane
 2,3,3,4,8-Pentamethylnonane
 2,3,3,5,5-Pentamethylnonane
 2,3,3,5,6-Pentamethylnonane
 2,3,3,5,7-Pentamethylnonane
 2,3,3,5,8-Pentamethylnonane
 2,3,3,6,6-Pentamethylnonane
 2,3,3,6,7-Pentamethylnonane
 2,3,3,6,8-Pentamethylnonane
 2,3,3,7,7-Pentamethylnonane
 2,3,3,7,8-Pentamethylnonane
 2,3,4,4,5-Pentamethylnonane
 2,3,4,4,6-Pentamethylnonane
 2,3,4,4,7-Pentamethylnonane
 2,3,4,4,8-Pentamethylnonane
 2,3,4,5,5-Pentamethylnonane
 2,3,4,5,6-Pentamethylnonane
 2,3,4,5,7-Pentamethylnonane
 2,3,4,5,8-Pentamethylnonane
 2,3,4,6,6-Pentamethylnonane
 2,3,4,6,7-Pentamethylnonane
 2,3,4,6,8-Pentamethylnonane
 2,3,4,7,7-Pentamethylnonane
 2,3,4,7,8-Pentamethylnonane
 2,3,5,5,6-Pentamethylnonane
 2,3,5,5,7-Pentamethylnonane
 2,3,5,5,8-Pentamethylnonane
 2,3,5,6,6-Pentamethylnonane
 2,3,5,6,7-Pentamethylnonane
 2,3,5,6,8-Pentamethylnonane
 2,3,5,7,7-Pentamethylnonane
 2,3,5,7,8-Pentamethylnonane
 2,3,6,6,7-Pentamethylnonane
 2,3,6,6,8-Pentamethylnonane
 2,3,6,7,7-Pentamethylnonane
 2,4,4,5,5-Pentamethylnonane
 2,4,4,5,6-Pentamethylnonane
 2,4,4,5,7-Pentamethylnonane
 2,4,4,5,8-Pentamethylnonane
 2,4,4,6,6-Pentamethylnonane
 2,4,4,6,7-Pentamethylnonane
 2,4,4,6,8-Pentamethylnonane
 2,4,4,7,7-Pentamethylnonane
 2,4,5,5,6-Pentamethylnonane
 2,4,5,5,7-Pentamethylnonane
 2,4,5,5,8-Pentamethylnonane
 2,4,5,6,6-Pentamethylnonane
 2,4,5,6,7-Pentamethylnonane
 2,4,5,6,8-Pentamethylnonane
 2,4,5,7,7-Pentamethylnonane
 2,4,6,6,7-Pentamethylnonane
 2,4,6,7,7-Pentamethylnonane
 2,5,5,6,6-Pentamethylnonane
 2,5,5,6,7-Pentamethylnonane
 2,5,5,7,7-Pentamethylnonane
 2,5,6,6,7-Pentamethylnonane
 2,5,6,7,7-Pentamethylnonane
 2,6,6,7,7-Pentamethylnonane
 3,3,4,4,5-Pentamethylnonane
 3,3,4,4,6-Pentamethylnonane
 3,3,4,4,7-Pentamethylnonane
 3,3,4,5,5-Pentamethylnonane
 3,3,4,5,6-Pentamethylnonane
 3,3,4,5,7-Pentamethylnonane
 3,3,4,6,6-Pentamethylnonane
 3,3,4,6,7-Pentamethylnonane
 3,3,4,7,7-Pentamethylnonane
 3,3,5,5,6-Pentamethylnonane
 3,3,5,5,7-Pentamethylnonane
 3,3,5,6,6-Pentamethylnonane
 3,3,5,6,7-Pentamethylnonane
 3,3,5,7,7-Pentamethylnonane
 3,3,6,6,7-Pentamethylnonane
 3,4,4,5,5-Pentamethylnonane
 3,4,4,5,6-Pentamethylnonane
 3,4,4,5,7-Pentamethylnonane
 3,4,4,6,6-Pentamethylnonane
 3,4,4,6,7-Pentamethylnonane
 3,4,5,5,6-Pentamethylnonane
 3,4,5,5,7-Pentamethylnonane
 3,4,5,6,6-Pentamethylnonane
 3,4,5,6,7-Pentamethylnonane
 3,5,5,6,6-Pentamethylnonane
 4,4,5,5,6-Pentamethylnonane
 4,4,5,6,6-Pentamethylnonane

Ethyl+Trimethyl

 3-Ethyl-2,2,3-trimethylnonane
 3-Ethyl-2,2,4-trimethylnonane
 3-Ethyl-2,2,5-trimethylnonane
 3-Ethyl-2,2,6-trimethylnonane
 3-Ethyl-2,2,7-trimethylnonane
 3-Ethyl-2,2,8-trimethylnonane
 3-Ethyl-2,3,4-trimethylnonane
 3-Ethyl-2,3,5-trimethylnonane
 3-Ethyl-2,3,6-trimethylnonane
 3-Ethyl-2,3,7-trimethylnonane
 3-Ethyl-2,3,8-trimethylnonane
 3-Ethyl-2,4,4-trimethylnonane
 3-Ethyl-2,4,5-trimethylnonane
 3-Ethyl-2,4,6-trimethylnonane
 3-Ethyl-2,4,7-trimethylnonane
 3-Ethyl-2,4,8-trimethylnonane
 3-Ethyl-2,5,5-trimethylnonane
 3-Ethyl-2,5,6-trimethylnonane
 3-Ethyl-2,5,7-trimethylnonane
 3-Ethyl-2,5,8-trimethylnonane
 3-Ethyl-2,6,6-trimethylnonane
 3-Ethyl-2,6,7-trimethylnonane
 3-Ethyl-2,6,8-trimethylnonane
 3-Ethyl-2,7,7-trimethylnonane
 3-Ethyl-2,7,8-trimethylnonane
 3-Ethyl-3,4,4-trimethylnonane
 3-Ethyl-3,4,5-trimethylnonane
 3-Ethyl-3,4,6-trimethylnonane
 3-Ethyl-3,4,7-trimethylnonane
 3-Ethyl-3,5,5-trimethylnonane
 3-Ethyl-3,5,6-trimethylnonane
 3-Ethyl-3,5,7-trimethylnonane
 3-Ethyl-3,6,6-trimethylnonane
 3-Ethyl-3,6,7-trimethylnonane
 3-Ethyl-3,7,7-trimethylnonane
 3-Ethyl-4,4,5-trimethylnonane
 3-Ethyl-4,4,6-trimethylnonane
 3-Ethyl-4,4,7-trimethylnonane
 3-Ethyl-4,5,5-trimethylnonane
 3-Ethyl-4,5,6-trimethylnonane
 3-Ethyl-4,5,7-trimethylnonane
 3-Ethyl-4,6,6-trimethylnonane
 3-Ethyl-4,6,7-trimethylnonane
 3-Ethyl-5,5,6-trimethylnonane
 3-Ethyl-5,5,7-trimethylnonane
 3-Ethyl-5,6,6-trimethylnonane
 4-Ethyl-2,2,3-trimethylnonane
 4-Ethyl-2,2,4-trimethylnonane
 4-Ethyl-2,2,5-trimethylnonane
 4-Ethyl-2,2,6-trimethylnonane
 4-Ethyl-2,2,7-trimethylnonane
 4-Ethyl-2,2,8-trimethylnonane
 4-Ethyl-2,3,3-trimethylnonane
 4-Ethyl-2,3,4-trimethylnonane
 4-Ethyl-2,3,5-trimethylnonane
 4-Ethyl-2,3,6-trimethylnonane
 4-Ethyl-2,3,7-trimethylnonane
 4-Ethyl-2,3,8-trimethylnonane
 4-Ethyl-2,4,5-trimethylnonane
 4-Ethyl-2,4,6-trimethylnonane
 4-Ethyl-2,4,7-trimethylnonane
 4-Ethyl-2,4,8-trimethylnonane
 4-Ethyl-2,5,5-trimethylnonane
 4-Ethyl-2,5,6-trimethylnonane
 4-Ethyl-2,5,7-trimethylnonane
 4-Ethyl-2,5,8-trimethylnonane
 4-Ethyl-2,6,6-trimethylnonane
 4-Ethyl-2,6,7-trimethylnonane
 4-Ethyl-2,6,8-trimethylnonane
 4-Ethyl-2,7,7-trimethylnonane
 4-Ethyl-3,3,4-trimethylnonane
 4-Ethyl-3,3,5-trimethylnonane
 4-Ethyl-3,3,6-trimethylnonane
 4-Ethyl-3,3,7-trimethylnonane
 4-Ethyl-3,4,5-trimethylnonane
 4-Ethyl-3,4,6-trimethylnonane
 4-Ethyl-3,4,7-trimethylnonane
 4-Ethyl-3,5,5-trimethylnonane
 4-Ethyl-3,5,6-trimethylnonane
 4-Ethyl-3,5,7-trimethylnonane
 4-Ethyl-3,6,6-trimethylnonane
 4-Ethyl-3,6,7-trimethylnonane
 4-Ethyl-4,5,5-trimethylnonane
 4-Ethyl-4,5,6-trimethylnonane
 4-Ethyl-4,6,6-trimethylnonane
 4-Ethyl-5,5,6-trimethylnonane
 5-Ethyl-2,2,3-trimethylnonane
 5-Ethyl-2,2,4-trimethylnonane
 5-Ethyl-2,2,5-trimethylnonane
 5-Ethyl-2,2,6-trimethylnonane
 5-Ethyl-2,2,7-trimethylnonane
 5-Ethyl-2,2,8-trimethylnonane
 5-Ethyl-2,3,3-trimethylnonane
 5-Ethyl-2,3,4-trimethylnonane
 5-Ethyl-2,3,5-trimethylnonane
 5-Ethyl-2,3,6-trimethylnonane
 5-Ethyl-2,3,7-trimethylnonane
 5-Ethyl-2,3,8-trimethylnonane
 5-Ethyl-2,4,4-trimethylnonane
 5-Ethyl-2,4,5-trimethylnonane
 5-Ethyl-2,4,6-trimethylnonane
 5-Ethyl-2,4,7-trimethylnonane
 5-Ethyl-2,4,8-trimethylnonane
 5-Ethyl-2,5,6-trimethylnonane
 5-Ethyl-2,5,7-trimethylnonane
 5-Ethyl-2,5,8-trimethylnonane
 5-Ethyl-2,6,6-trimethylnonane
 5-Ethyl-2,6,7-trimethylnonane
 5-Ethyl-2,7,7-trimethylnonane
 5-Ethyl-3,3,4-trimethylnonane
 5-Ethyl-3,3,5-trimethylnonane
 5-Ethyl-3,3,6-trimethylnonane
 5-Ethyl-3,3,7-trimethylnonane
 5-Ethyl-3,4,4-trimethylnonane
 5-Ethyl-3,4,5-trimethylnonane
 5-Ethyl-3,4,6-trimethylnonane
 5-Ethyl-3,4,7-trimethylnonane
 5-Ethyl-3,5,6-trimethylnonane
 5-Ethyl-3,5,7-trimethylnonane
 5-Ethyl-3,6,6-trimethylnonane
 5-Ethyl-4,4,5-trimethylnonane
 5-Ethyl-4,4,6-trimethylnonane
 5-Ethyl-4,5,6-trimethylnonane
 6-Ethyl-2,2,3-trimethylnonane
 6-Ethyl-2,2,4-trimethylnonane
 6-Ethyl-2,2,5-trimethylnonane
 6-Ethyl-2,2,6-trimethylnonane
 6-Ethyl-2,2,7-trimethylnonane
 6-Ethyl-2,2,8-trimethylnonane
 6-Ethyl-2,3,3-trimethylnonane
 6-Ethyl-2,3,4-trimethylnonane
 6-Ethyl-2,3,5-trimethylnonane
 6-Ethyl-2,3,6-trimethylnonane
 6-Ethyl-2,3,7-trimethylnonane
 6-Ethyl-2,3,8-trimethylnonane
 6-Ethyl-2,4,4-trimethylnonane
 6-Ethyl-2,4,5-trimethylnonane
 6-Ethyl-2,4,6-trimethylnonane
 6-Ethyl-2,4,7-trimethylnonane
 6-Ethyl-2,5,5-trimethylnonane
 6-Ethyl-2,5,6-trimethylnonane
 6-Ethyl-2,5,7-trimethylnonane
 6-Ethyl-2,6,7-trimethylnonane
 6-Ethyl-2,7,7-trimethylnonane
 6-Ethyl-3,3,4-trimethylnonane
 6-Ethyl-3,3,5-trimethylnonane
 6-Ethyl-3,3,6-trimethylnonane
 6-Ethyl-3,3,7-trimethylnonane
 6-Ethyl-3,4,4-trimethylnonane
 6-Ethyl-3,4,5-trimethylnonane
 6-Ethyl-3,4,6-trimethylnonane
 6-Ethyl-3,5,5-trimethylnonane
 6-Ethyl-3,5,6-trimethylnonane
 6-Ethyl-4,4,5-trimethylnonane
 7-Ethyl-2,2,3-trimethylnonane
 7-Ethyl-2,2,4-trimethylnonane
 7-Ethyl-2,2,5-trimethylnonane
 7-Ethyl-2,2,6-trimethylnonane
 7-Ethyl-2,2,7-trimethylnonane
 7-Ethyl-2,2,8-trimethylnonane
 7-Ethyl-2,3,3-trimethylnonane
 7-Ethyl-2,3,4-trimethylnonane
 7-Ethyl-2,3,5-trimethylnonane
 7-Ethyl-2,3,6-trimethylnonane
 7-Ethyl-2,3,7-trimethylnonane
 7-Ethyl-2,4,4-trimethylnonane
 7-Ethyl-2,4,5-trimethylnonane
 7-Ethyl-2,4,6-trimethylnonane
 7-Ethyl-2,4,7-trimethylnonane
 7-Ethyl-2,5,5-trimethylnonane
 7-Ethyl-2,5,6-trimethylnonane
 7-Ethyl-2,5,7-trimethylnonane
 7-Ethyl-2,6,6-trimethylnonane
 7-Ethyl-2,6,7-trimethylnonane
 7-Ethyl-3,3,4-trimethylnonane
 7-Ethyl-3,3,5-trimethylnonane
 7-Ethyl-3,3,6-trimethylnonane
 7-Ethyl-3,4,4-trimethylnonane
 7-Ethyl-3,4,5-trimethylnonane

Diethyl+Methyl

 3,3-Diethyl-2-methylnonane
 3,3-Diethyl-4-methylnonane
 3,3-Diethyl-5-methylnonane
 3,3-Diethyl-6-methylnonane
 3,3-Diethyl-7-methylnonane
 3,4-Diethyl-2-methylnonane
 3,4-Diethyl-3-methylnonane
 3,4-Diethyl-4-methylnonane
 3,4-Diethyl-5-methylnonane
 3,4-Diethyl-6-methylnonane
 3,4-Diethyl-7-methylnonane
 3,5-Diethyl-2-methylnonane
 3,5-Diethyl-3-methylnonane
 3,5-Diethyl-4-methylnonane
 3,5-Diethyl-5-methylnonane
 3,5-Diethyl-6-methylnonane
 3,5-Diethyl-7-methylnonane
 3,6-Diethyl-2-methylnonane
 3,6-Diethyl-3-methylnonane
 3,6-Diethyl-4-methylnonane
 3,6-Diethyl-5-methylnonane
 3,6-Diethyl-6-methylnonane
 3,7-Diethyl-2-methylnonane
 3,7-Diethyl-3-methylnonane
 3,7-Diethyl-4-methylnonane
 3,7-Diethyl-5-methylnonane
 4,4-Diethyl-2-methylnonane
 4,4-Diethyl-3-methylnonane
 4,4-Diethyl-5-methylnonane
 4,4-Diethyl-6-methylnonane
 4,5-Diethyl-2-methylnonane
 4,5-Diethyl-3-methylnonane
 4,5-Diethyl-4-methylnonane
 4,5-Diethyl-5-methylnonane
 4,5-Diethyl-6-methylnonane
 4,6-Diethyl-2-methylnonane
 4,6-Diethyl-3-methylnonane
 4,6-Diethyl-4-methylnonane
 4,6-Diethyl-5-methylnonane
 4,7-Diethyl-2-methylnonane
 4,7-Diethyl-3-methylnonane
 5,5-Diethyl-2-methylnonane
 5,5-Diethyl-3-methylnonane
 5,5-Diethyl-4-methylnonane
 5,6-Diethyl-2-methylnonane
 5,6-Diethyl-3-methylnonane
 5,7-Diethyl-2-methylnonane
 6,6-Diethyl-2-methylnonane
 6,6-Diethyl-3-methylnonane
 6,7-Diethyl-2-methylnonane
 7,7-Diethyl-2-methylnonane

Dimethyl+Propyl

 2,2-Dimethyl-4-propylnonane
 2,3-Dimethyl-4-propylnonane
 2,4-Dimethyl-4-propylnonane
 2,5-Dimethyl-4-propylnonane
 2,6-Dimethyl-4-propylnonane
 2,7-Dimethyl-4-propylnonane
 2,8-Dimethyl-4-propylnonane
 3,3-Dimethyl-4-propylnonane
 3,4-Dimethyl-4-propylnonane
 3,5-Dimethyl-4-propylnonane
 3,6-Dimethyl-4-propylnonane
 3,7-Dimethyl-4-propylnonane
 4,5-Dimethyl-4-propylnonane
 4,6-Dimethyl-4-propylnonane
 5,5-Dimethyl-4-propylnonane
 5,6-Dimethyl-4-propylnonane
 2,2-Dimethyl-5-propylnonane
 2,3-Dimethyl-5-propylnonane
 2,4-Dimethyl-5-propylnonane
 2,5-Dimethyl-5-propylnonane
 2,6-Dimethyl-5-propylnonane
 2,7-Dimethyl-5-propylnonane
 2,8-Dimethyl-5-propylnonane
 3,3-Dimethyl-5-propylnonane
 3,4-Dimethyl-5-propylnonane
 3,5-Dimethyl-5-propylnonane
 3,6-Dimethyl-5-propylnonane
 3,7-Dimethyl-5-propylnonane
 4,4-Dimethyl-5-propylnonane
 4,5-Dimethyl-5-propylnonane
 4,6-Dimethyl-5-propylnonane
 2,2-Dimethyl-6-propylnonane
 2,3-Dimethyl-6-propylnonane
 2,4-Dimethyl-6-propylnonane
 2,5-Dimethyl-6-propylnonane
 2,6-Dimethyl-6-propylnonane
 2,7-Dimethyl-6-propylnonane
 3,3-Dimethyl-6-propylnonane
 3,4-Dimethyl-6-propylnonane
 3,5-Dimethyl-6-propylnonane
 3,6-Dimethyl-6-propylnonane
 4,4-Dimethyl-6-propylnonane
 2,2-Dimethyl-3-(1-methylethyl)nonane
 2,3-Dimethyl-3-(1-methylethyl)nonane
 2,4-Dimethyl-3-(1-methylethyl)nonane
 2,5-Dimethyl-3-(1-methylethyl)nonane
 2,6-Dimethyl-3-(1-methylethyl)nonane
 2,7-Dimethyl-3-(1-methylethyl)nonane
 2,8-Dimethyl-3-(1-methylethyl)nonane
 2,2-Dimethyl-4-(1-methylethyl)nonane
 2,3-Dimethyl-4-(1-methylethyl)nonane
 2,4-Dimethyl-4-(1-methylethyl)nonane
 2,5-Dimethyl-4-(1-methylethyl)nonane
 2,6-Dimethyl-4-(1-methylethyl)nonane
 2,7-Dimethyl-4-(1-methylethyl)nonane
 2,8-Dimethyl-4-(1-methylethyl)nonane
 3,3-Dimethyl-4-(1-methylethyl)nonane
 3,4-Dimethyl-4-(1-methylethyl)nonane
 3,5-Dimethyl-4-(1-methylethyl)nonane
 3,6-Dimethyl-4-(1-methylethyl)nonane
 3,7-Dimethyl-4-(1-methylethyl)nonane
 4,5-Dimethyl-4-(1-methylethyl)nonane
 4,6-Dimethyl-4-(1-methylethyl)nonane
 5,5-Dimethyl-4-(1-methylethyl)nonane
 5,6-Dimethyl-4-(1-methylethyl)nonane
 2,2-Dimethyl-5-(1-methylethyl)nonane
 2,3-Dimethyl-5-(1-methylethyl)nonane
 2,4-Dimethyl-5-(1-methylethyl)nonane
 2,5-Dimethyl-5-(1-methylethyl)nonane
 2,6-Dimethyl-5-(1-methylethyl)nonane
 2,7-Dimethyl-5-(1-methylethyl)nonane
 2,8-Dimethyl-5-(1-methylethyl)nonane
 3,3-Dimethyl-5-(1-methylethyl)nonane
 3,4-Dimethyl-5-(1-methylethyl)nonane
 3,5-Dimethyl-5-(1-methylethyl)nonane
 3,6-Dimethyl-5-(1-methylethyl)nonane
 3,7-Dimethyl-5-(1-methylethyl)nonane
 4,4-Dimethyl-5-(1-methylethyl)nonane
 4,5-Dimethyl-5-(1-methylethyl)nonane
 4,6-Dimethyl-5-(1-methylethyl)nonane
 2,2-Dimethyl-6-(1-methylethyl)nonane
 2,3-Dimethyl-6-(1-methylethyl)nonane
 2,4-Dimethyl-6-(1-methylethyl)nonane
 2,5-Dimethyl-6-(1-methylethyl)nonane
 2,6-Dimethyl-6-(1-methylethyl)nonane
 2,7-Dimethyl-6-(1-methylethyl)nonane
 3,3-Dimethyl-6-(1-methylethyl)nonane
 3,4-Dimethyl-6-(1-methylethyl)nonane
 3,5-Dimethyl-6-(1-methylethyl)nonane
 3,6-Dimethyl-6-(1-methylethyl)nonane
 4,4-Dimethyl-6-(1-methylethyl)nonane

Ethyl+Propyl

 3-Ethyl-4-propylnonane
 4-Ethyl-4-propylnonane
 5-Ethyl-4-propylnonane
 6-Ethyl-4-propylnonane
 3-Ethyl-5-propylnonane
 4-Ethyl-5-propylnonane
 5-Ethyl-5-propylnonane
 3-Ethyl-6-propylnonane
 3-Ethyl-4-(1-methylethyl)nonane
 4-Ethyl-4-(1-methylethyl)nonane
 5-Ethyl-4-(1-methylethyl)nonane
 6-Ethyl-4-(1-methylethyl)nonane
 3-Ethyl-5-(1-methylethyl)nonane
 4-Ethyl-5-(1-methylethyl)nonane
 5-Ethyl-5-(1-methylethyl)nonane
 3-Ethyl-6-(1-methylethyl)nonane

Butyl+Methyl

 5-Butyl-2-methylnonane
 5-Butyl-3-methylnonane
 5-Butyl-4-methylnonane
 5-Butyl-5-methylnonane
 2-Methyl-4-(1-methylpropyl)nonane
 3-Methyl-4-(1-methylpropyl)nonane
 2-Methyl-5-(1-methylpropyl)nonane
 3-Methyl-5-(1-methylpropyl)nonane
 4-Methyl-5-(1-methylpropyl)nonane
 5-Methyl-5-(1-methylpropyl)nonane
 2-Methyl-4-(2-methylpropyl)nonane
 2-Methyl-5-(2-methylpropyl)nonane
 3-Methyl-5-(2-methylpropyl)nonane
 4-Methyl-5-(2-methylpropyl)nonane
 5-Methyl-5-(2-methylpropyl)nonane

Dimethylethyl+Methyl

 4-(1,1-Dimethylethyl)-2-methylnonane
 4-(1,1-Dimethylethyl)-3-methylnonane
 4-(1,1-Dimethylethyl)-4-methylnonane
 4-(1,1-Dimethylethyl)-5-methylnonane
 4-(1,1-Dimethylethyl)-6-methylnonane
 5-(1,1-Dimethylethyl)-2-methylnonane
 5-(1,1-Dimethylethyl)-3-methylnonane
 5-(1,1-Dimethylethyl)-4-methylnonane
 5-(1,1-Dimethylethyl)-5-methylnonane
 6-(1,1-Dimethylethyl)-2-methylnonane
 6-(1,1-Dimethylethyl)-3-methylnonane

Dimethylpropyl

 5-(1,1-Dimethylpropyl)nonane
 5-(1,2-Dimethylpropyl)nonane
 5-(2,2-Dimethylpropyl)nonane

Ethylpropyl
 5-(1-Ethylpropyl)nonane

With octane backbone

Hexamethyl

 2,2,3,3,4,4-Hexamethyloctane
 2,2,3,3,4,5-Hexamethyloctane
 2,2,3,3,4,6-Hexamethyloctane
 2,2,3,3,4,7-Hexamethyloctane
 2,2,3,3,5,5-Hexamethyloctane
 2,2,3,3,5,6-Hexamethyloctane
 2,2,3,3,5,7-Hexamethyloctane
 2,2,3,3,6,6-Hexamethyloctane
 2,2,3,3,6,7-Hexamethyloctane
 2,2,3,3,7,7-Hexamethyloctane
 2,2,3,4,4,5-Hexamethyloctane
 2,2,3,4,4,6-Hexamethyloctane
 2,2,3,4,4,7-Hexamethyloctane
 2,2,3,4,5,5-Hexamethyloctane
 2,2,3,4,5,6-Hexamethyloctane
 2,2,3,4,5,7-Hexamethyloctane
 2,2,3,4,6,6-Hexamethyloctane
 2,2,3,4,6,7-Hexamethyloctane
 2,2,3,4,7,7-Hexamethyloctane
 2,2,3,5,5,6-Hexamethyloctane
 2,2,3,5,5,7-Hexamethyloctane
 2,2,3,5,6,6-Hexamethyloctane
 2,2,3,5,6,7-Hexamethyloctane
 2,2,3,5,7,7-Hexamethyloctane
 2,2,3,6,6,7-Hexamethyloctane
 2,2,3,6,7,7-Hexamethyloctane
 2,2,4,4,5,5-Hexamethyloctane
 2,2,4,4,5,6-Hexamethyloctane
 2,2,4,4,5,7-Hexamethyloctane
 2,2,4,4,6,6-Hexamethyloctane
 2,2,4,4,6,7-Hexamethyloctane
 2,2,4,4,7,7-Hexamethyloctane
 2,2,4,5,5,6-Hexamethyloctane
 2,2,4,5,5,7-Hexamethyloctane
 2,2,4,5,6,6-Hexamethyloctane
 2,2,4,5,6,7-Hexamethyloctane
 2,2,4,5,7,7-Hexamethyloctane
 2,2,4,6,6,7-Hexamethyloctane
 2,2,5,5,6,6-Hexamethyloctane
 2,2,5,5,6,7-Hexamethyloctane
 2,2,5,6,6,7-Hexamethyloctane
 2,3,3,4,4,5-Hexamethyloctane
 2,3,3,4,4,6-Hexamethyloctane
 2,3,3,4,4,7-Hexamethyloctane
 2,3,3,4,5,5-Hexamethyloctane
 2,3,3,4,5,6-Hexamethyloctane
 2,3,3,4,5,7-Hexamethyloctane
 2,3,3,4,6,6-Hexamethyloctane
 2,3,3,4,6,7-Hexamethyloctane
 2,3,3,5,5,6-Hexamethyloctane
 2,3,3,5,5,7-Hexamethyloctane
 2,3,3,5,6,6-Hexamethyloctane
 2,3,3,5,6,7-Hexamethyloctane
 2,3,3,6,6,7-Hexamethyloctane
 2,3,4,4,5,5-Hexamethyloctane
 2,3,4,4,5,6-Hexamethyloctane
 2,3,4,4,5,7-Hexamethyloctane
 2,3,4,4,6,6-Hexamethyloctane
 2,3,4,4,6,7-Hexamethyloctane
 2,3,4,5,5,6-Hexamethyloctane
 2,3,4,5,5,7-Hexamethyloctane
 2,3,4,5,6,6-Hexamethyloctane
 2,3,4,5,6,7-Hexamethyloctane
 2,3,5,5,6,6-Hexamethyloctane
 2,4,4,5,5,6-Hexamethyloctane
 2,4,4,5,5,7-Hexamethyloctane
 2,4,4,5,6,6-Hexamethyloctane
 2,4,5,5,6,6-Hexamethyloctane
 3,3,4,4,5,5-Hexamethyloctane
 3,3,4,4,5,6-Hexamethyloctane
 3,3,4,4,6,6-Hexamethyloctane
 3,3,4,5,5,6-Hexamethyloctane
 3,3,4,5,6,6-Hexamethyloctane
 3,4,4,5,5,6-Hexamethyloctane

Ethyl+Tetramethyl

 3-Ethyl-2,2,3,4-tetramethyloctane
 3-Ethyl-2,2,3,5-tetramethyloctane
 3-Ethyl-2,2,3,6-tetramethyloctane
 3-Ethyl-2,2,3,7-tetramethyloctane
 3-Ethyl-2,2,4,4-tetramethyloctane
 3-Ethyl-2,2,4,5-tetramethyloctane
 3-Ethyl-2,2,4,6-tetramethyloctane
 3-Ethyl-2,2,4,7-tetramethyloctane
 3-Ethyl-2,2,5,5-tetramethyloctane
 3-Ethyl-2,2,5,6-tetramethyloctane
 3-Ethyl-2,2,5,7-tetramethyloctane
 3-Ethyl-2,2,6,6-tetramethyloctane
 3-Ethyl-2,2,6,7-tetramethyloctane
 3-Ethyl-2,2,7,7-tetramethyloctane
 3-Ethyl-2,3,4,4-tetramethyloctane
 3-Ethyl-2,3,4,5-tetramethyloctane
 3-Ethyl-2,3,4,6-tetramethyloctane
 3-Ethyl-2,3,4,7-tetramethyloctane
 3-Ethyl-2,3,5,5-tetramethyloctane
 3-Ethyl-2,3,5,6-tetramethyloctane
 3-Ethyl-2,3,5,7-tetramethyloctane
 3-Ethyl-2,3,6,6-tetramethyloctane
 3-Ethyl-2,3,6,7-tetramethyloctane
 3-Ethyl-2,4,4,5-tetramethyloctane
 3-Ethyl-2,4,4,6-tetramethyloctane
 3-Ethyl-2,4,4,7-tetramethyloctane
 3-Ethyl-2,4,5,5-tetramethyloctane
 3-Ethyl-2,4,5,6-tetramethyloctane
 3-Ethyl-2,4,5,7-tetramethyloctane
 3-Ethyl-2,4,6,6-tetramethyloctane
 3-Ethyl-2,4,6,7-tetramethyloctane
 3-Ethyl-2,5,5,6-tetramethyloctane
 3-Ethyl-2,5,5,7-tetramethyloctane
 3-Ethyl-2,5,6,6-tetramethyloctane
 3-Ethyl-3,4,4,5-tetramethyloctane
 3-Ethyl-3,4,4,6-tetramethyloctane
 3-Ethyl-3,4,5,5-tetramethyloctane
 3-Ethyl-3,4,5,6-tetramethyloctane
 3-Ethyl-3,4,6,6-tetramethyloctane
 3-Ethyl-3,5,5,6-tetramethyloctane
 3-Ethyl-4,4,5,5-tetramethyloctane
 3-Ethyl-4,4,5,6-tetramethyloctane
 4-Ethyl-2,2,3,3-tetramethyloctane
 4-Ethyl-2,2,3,4-tetramethyloctane
 4-Ethyl-2,2,3,5-tetramethyloctane
 4-Ethyl-2,2,3,6-tetramethyloctane
 4-Ethyl-2,2,3,7-tetramethyloctane
 4-Ethyl-2,2,4,5-tetramethyloctane
 4-Ethyl-2,2,4,6-tetramethyloctane
 4-Ethyl-2,2,4,7-tetramethyloctane
 4-Ethyl-2,2,5,5-tetramethyloctane
 4-Ethyl-2,2,5,6-tetramethyloctane
 4-Ethyl-2,2,5,7-tetramethyloctane
 4-Ethyl-2,2,6,6-tetramethyloctane
 4-Ethyl-2,2,6,7-tetramethyloctane
 4-Ethyl-2,2,7,7-tetramethyloctane
 4-Ethyl-2,3,3,4-tetramethyloctane
 4-Ethyl-2,3,3,5-tetramethyloctane
 4-Ethyl-2,3,3,6-tetramethyloctane
 4-Ethyl-2,3,3,7-tetramethyloctane
 4-Ethyl-2,3,4,5-tetramethyloctane
 4-Ethyl-2,3,4,6-tetramethyloctane
 4-Ethyl-2,3,4,7-tetramethyloctane
 4-Ethyl-2,3,5,5-tetramethyloctane
 4-Ethyl-2,3,5,6-tetramethyloctane
 4-Ethyl-2,3,5,7-tetramethyloctane
 4-Ethyl-2,3,6,6-tetramethyloctane
 4-Ethyl-2,3,6,7-tetramethyloctane
 4-Ethyl-2,4,5,5-tetramethyloctane
 4-Ethyl-2,4,5,6-tetramethyloctane
 4-Ethyl-2,4,5,7-tetramethyloctane
 4-Ethyl-2,4,6,6-tetramethyloctane
 4-Ethyl-2,5,5,6-tetramethyloctane
 4-Ethyl-2,5,6,6-tetramethyloctane
 4-Ethyl-3,3,4,5-tetramethyloctane
 4-Ethyl-3,3,4,6-tetramethyloctane
 4-Ethyl-3,3,5,5-tetramethyloctane
 4-Ethyl-3,3,5,6-tetramethyloctane
 4-Ethyl-3,3,6,6-tetramethyloctane
 4-Ethyl-3,4,5,5-tetramethyloctane
 4-Ethyl-3,4,5,6-tetramethyloctane
 5-Ethyl-2,2,3,3-tetramethyloctane
 5-Ethyl-2,2,3,4-tetramethyloctane
 5-Ethyl-2,2,3,5-tetramethyloctane
 5-Ethyl-2,2,3,6-tetramethyloctane
 5-Ethyl-2,2,3,7-tetramethyloctane
 5-Ethyl-2,2,4,4-tetramethyloctane
 5-Ethyl-2,2,4,5-tetramethyloctane
 5-Ethyl-2,2,4,6-tetramethyloctane
 5-Ethyl-2,2,4,7-tetramethyloctane
 5-Ethyl-2,2,5,6-tetramethyloctane
 5-Ethyl-2,2,5,7-tetramethyloctane
 5-Ethyl-2,2,6,6-tetramethyloctane
 5-Ethyl-2,2,6,7-tetramethyloctane
 5-Ethyl-2,3,3,4-tetramethyloctane
 5-Ethyl-2,3,3,5-tetramethyloctane
 5-Ethyl-2,3,3,6-tetramethyloctane
 5-Ethyl-2,3,3,7-tetramethyloctane
 5-Ethyl-2,3,4,4-tetramethyloctane
 5-Ethyl-2,3,4,5-tetramethyloctane
 5-Ethyl-2,3,4,6-tetramethyloctane
 5-Ethyl-2,3,4,7-tetramethyloctane
 5-Ethyl-2,3,5,6-tetramethyloctane
 5-Ethyl-2,3,5,7-tetramethyloctane
 5-Ethyl-2,3,6,6-tetramethyloctane
 5-Ethyl-2,4,4,5-tetramethyloctane
 5-Ethyl-2,4,4,6-tetramethyloctane
 5-Ethyl-2,4,4,7-tetramethyloctane
 5-Ethyl-2,4,5,6-tetramethyloctane
 5-Ethyl-2,4,6,6-tetramethyloctane
 5-Ethyl-2,5,6,6-tetramethyloctane
 5-Ethyl-3,3,4,4-tetramethyloctane
 5-Ethyl-3,3,4,5-tetramethyloctane
 5-Ethyl-3,3,4,6-tetramethyloctane
 5-Ethyl-3,3,5,6-tetramethyloctane
 5-Ethyl-3,4,4,5-tetramethyloctane
 5-Ethyl-3,4,4,6-tetramethyloctane
 6-Ethyl-2,2,3,3-tetramethyloctane
 6-Ethyl-2,2,3,4-tetramethyloctane
 6-Ethyl-2,2,3,5-tetramethyloctane
 6-Ethyl-2,2,3,6-tetramethyloctane
 6-Ethyl-2,2,3,7-tetramethyloctane
 6-Ethyl-2,2,4,4-tetramethyloctane
 6-Ethyl-2,2,4,5-tetramethyloctane
 6-Ethyl-2,2,4,6-tetramethyloctane
 6-Ethyl-2,2,4,7-tetramethyloctane
 6-Ethyl-2,2,5,5-tetramethyloctane
 6-Ethyl-2,2,5,6-tetramethyloctane
 6-Ethyl-2,2,5,7-tetramethyloctane
 6-Ethyl-2,2,6,7-tetramethyloctane
 6-Ethyl-2,3,3,4-tetramethyloctane
 6-Ethyl-2,3,3,5-tetramethyloctane
 6-Ethyl-2,3,3,6-tetramethyloctane
 6-Ethyl-2,3,3,7-tetramethyloctane
 6-Ethyl-2,3,4,4-tetramethyloctane
 6-Ethyl-2,3,4,5-tetramethyloctane
 6-Ethyl-2,3,4,6-tetramethyloctane
 6-Ethyl-2,3,4,7-tetramethyloctane
 6-Ethyl-2,3,5,5-tetramethyloctane
 6-Ethyl-2,3,5,6-tetramethyloctane
 6-Ethyl-2,4,4,5-tetramethyloctane
 6-Ethyl-2,4,4,6-tetramethyloctane
 6-Ethyl-2,4,5,5-tetramethyloctane
 6-Ethyl-2,4,5,6-tetramethyloctane
 6-Ethyl-2,5,5,6-tetramethyloctane
 6-Ethyl-3,3,4,4-tetramethyloctane
 6-Ethyl-3,3,4,5-tetramethyloctane
 6-Ethyl-3,3,4,6-tetramethyloctane
 6-Ethyl-3,3,5,5-tetramethyloctane
 6-Ethyl-3,4,4,5-tetramethyloctane

Diethyl+Dimethyl

 3,3-Diethyl-2,2-dimethyloctane
 3,3-Diethyl-2,4-dimethyloctane
 3,3-Diethyl-2,5-dimethyloctane
 3,3-Diethyl-2,6-dimethyloctane
 3,3-Diethyl-2,7-dimethyloctane
 3,3-Diethyl-4,4-dimethyloctane
 3,3-Diethyl-4,5-dimethyloctane
 3,3-Diethyl-4,6-dimethyloctane
 3,3-Diethyl-5,5-dimethyloctane
 3,3-Diethyl-5,6-dimethyloctane
 3,3-Diethyl-6,6-dimethyloctane
 3,4-Diethyl-2,2-dimethyloctane
 3,4-Diethyl-2,3-dimethyloctane
 3,4-Diethyl-2,4-dimethyloctane
 3,4-Diethyl-2,5-dimethyloctane
 3,4-Diethyl-2,6-dimethyloctane
 3,4-Diethyl-2,7-dimethyloctane
 3,4-Diethyl-3,4-dimethyloctane
 3,4-Diethyl-3,5-dimethyloctane
 3,4-Diethyl-3,6-dimethyloctane
 3,4-Diethyl-4,5-dimethyloctane
 3,4-Diethyl-4,6-dimethyloctane
 3,4-Diethyl-5,5-dimethyloctane
 3,4-Diethyl-5,6-dimethyloctane
 3,5-Diethyl-2,2-dimethyloctane
 3,5-Diethyl-2,3-dimethyloctane
 3,5-Diethyl-2,4-dimethyloctane
 3,5-Diethyl-2,5-dimethyloctane
 3,5-Diethyl-2,6-dimethyloctane
 3,5-Diethyl-2,7-dimethyloctane
 3,5-Diethyl-3,4-dimethyloctane
 3,5-Diethyl-3,5-dimethyloctane
 3,5-Diethyl-3,6-dimethyloctane
 3,5-Diethyl-4,4-dimethyloctane
 3,5-Diethyl-4,5-dimethyloctane
 3,5-Diethyl-4,6-dimethyloctane
 3,6-Diethyl-2,2-dimethyloctane
 3,6-Diethyl-2,3-dimethyloctane
 3,6-Diethyl-2,4-dimethyloctane
 3,6-Diethyl-2,5-dimethyloctane
 3,6-Diethyl-2,6-dimethyloctane
 3,6-Diethyl-2,7-dimethyloctane
 3,6-Diethyl-3,4-dimethyloctane
 3,6-Diethyl-3,5-dimethyloctane
 3,6-Diethyl-3,6-dimethyloctane
 3,6-Diethyl-4,4-dimethyloctane
 3,6-Diethyl-4,5-dimethyloctane
 4,4-Diethyl-2,2-dimethyloctane
 4,4-Diethyl-2,3-dimethyloctane
 4,4-Diethyl-2,5-dimethyloctane
 4,4-Diethyl-2,6-dimethyloctane
 4,4-Diethyl-2,7-dimethyloctane
 4,4-Diethyl-3,3-dimethyloctane
 4,4-Diethyl-3,5-dimethyloctane
 4,4-Diethyl-3,6-dimethyloctane
 4,4-Diethyl-5,5-dimethyloctane
 4,5-Diethyl-2,2-dimethyloctane
 4,5-Diethyl-2,3-dimethyloctane
 4,5-Diethyl-2,4-dimethyloctane
 4,5-Diethyl-2,5-dimethyloctane
 4,5-Diethyl-2,6-dimethyloctane
 4,5-Diethyl-2,7-dimethyloctane
 4,5-Diethyl-3,3-dimethyloctane
 4,5-Diethyl-3,4-dimethyloctane
 4,5-Diethyl-3,5-dimethyloctane
 4,5-Diethyl-3,6-dimethyloctane
 4,5-Diethyl-4,5-dimethyloctane
 4,6-Diethyl-2,2-dimethyloctane
 4,6-Diethyl-2,3-dimethyloctane
 4,6-Diethyl-2,4-dimethyloctane
 4,6-Diethyl-2,5-dimethyloctane
 4,6-Diethyl-2,6-dimethyloctane
 4,6-Diethyl-3,3-dimethyloctane
 4,6-Diethyl-3,4-dimethyloctane
 5,5-Diethyl-2,2-dimethyloctane
 5,5-Diethyl-2,3-dimethyloctane
 5,5-Diethyl-2,4-dimethyloctane
 5,5-Diethyl-2,6-dimethyloctane
 5,5-Diethyl-3,3-dimethyloctane
 5,5-Diethyl-3,4-dimethyloctane
 5,6-Diethyl-2,2-dimethyloctane
 5,6-Diethyl-2,3-dimethyloctane
 5,6-Diethyl-2,4-dimethyloctane
 5,6-Diethyl-2,5-dimethyloctane
 5,6-Diethyl-2,6-dimethyloctane
 5,6-Diethyl-3,3-dimethyloctane
 6,6-Diethyl-2,2-dimethyloctane
 6,6-Diethyl-2,3-dimethyloctane
 6,6-Diethyl-2,4-dimethyloctane
 6,6-Diethyl-2,5-dimethyloctane

Triethyl

 3,3,4-Triethyloctane
 3,3,5-Triethyloctane
 3,3,6-Triethyloctane
 3,4,4-Triethyloctane
 3,4,5-Triethyloctane
 3,4,6-Triethyloctane
 3,5,5-Triethyloctane
 4,4,5-Triethyloctane

Trimethyl+Propyl

 2,2,3-Trimethyl-4-propyloctane
 2,2,4-Trimethyl-4-propyloctane
 2,2,5-Trimethyl-4-propyloctane
 2,2,6-Trimethyl-4-propyloctane
 2,2,7-Trimethyl-4-propyloctane
 2,3,3-Trimethyl-4-propyloctane
 2,3,4-Trimethyl-4-propyloctane
 2,3,5-Trimethyl-4-propyloctane
 2,3,6-Trimethyl-4-propyloctane
 2,3,7-Trimethyl-4-propyloctane
 2,4,5-Trimethyl-4-propyloctane
 2,4,6-Trimethyl-4-propyloctane
 2,4,7-Trimethyl-4-propyloctane
 2,5,5-Trimethyl-4-propyloctane
 2,5,6-Trimethyl-4-propyloctane
 2,5,7-Trimethyl-4-propyloctane
 2,6,6-Trimethyl-4-propyloctane
 3,3,4-Trimethyl-4-propyloctane
 3,3,5-Trimethyl-4-propyloctane
 3,3,6-Trimethyl-4-propyloctane
 3,4,5-Trimethyl-4-propyloctane
 3,4,6-Trimethyl-4-propyloctane
 3,5,5-Trimethyl-4-propyloctane
 3,5,6-Trimethyl-4-propyloctane
 4,5,5-Trimethyl-4-propyloctane
 2,2,3-Trimethyl-5-propyloctane
 2,2,4-Trimethyl-5-propyloctane
 2,2,5-Trimethyl-5-propyloctane
 2,2,6-Trimethyl-5-propyloctane
 2,2,7-Trimethyl-5-propyloctane
 2,3,3-Trimethyl-5-propyloctane
 2,3,4-Trimethyl-5-propyloctane
 2,3,5-Trimethyl-5-propyloctane
 2,3,6-Trimethyl-5-propyloctane
 2,3,7-Trimethyl-5-propyloctane
 2,4,4-Trimethyl-5-propyloctane
 2,4,5-Trimethyl-5-propyloctane
 2,4,6-Trimethyl-5-propyloctane
 2,5,6-Trimethyl-5-propyloctane
 2,6,6-Trimethyl-5-propyloctane
 3,3,4-Trimethyl-5-propyloctane
 3,3,5-Trimethyl-5-propyloctane
 3,3,6-Trimethyl-5-propyloctane
 3,4,4-Trimethyl-5-propyloctane
 3,4,5-Trimethyl-5-propyloctane
 2,2,3-Trimethyl-3-(1-methylethyl)octane
 2,2,4-Trimethyl-3-(1-methylethyl)octane
 2,2,5-Trimethyl-3-(1-methylethyl)octane
 2,2,6-Trimethyl-3-(1-methylethyl)octane
 2,2,7-Trimethyl-3-(1-methylethyl)octane
 2,3,4-Trimethyl-3-(1-methylethyl)octane
 2,3,5-Trimethyl-3-(1-methylethyl)octane
 2,3,6-Trimethyl-3-(1-methylethyl)octane
 2,3,7-Trimethyl-3-(1-methylethyl)octane
 2,4,4-Trimethyl-3-(1-methylethyl)octane
 2,4,5-Trimethyl-3-(1-methylethyl)octane
 2,4,6-Trimethyl-3-(1-methylethyl)octane
 2,4,7-Trimethyl-3-(1-methylethyl)octane
 2,5,5-Trimethyl-3-(1-methylethyl)octane
 2,5,6-Trimethyl-3-(1-methylethyl)octane
 2,5,7-Trimethyl-3-(1-methylethyl)octane
 2,6,6-Trimethyl-3-(1-methylethyl)octane
 2,6,7-Trimethyl-3-(1-methylethyl)octane
 2,2,3-Trimethyl-4-(1-methylethyl)octane
 2,2,4-Trimethyl-4-(1-methylethyl)octane
 2,2,5-Trimethyl-4-(1-methylethyl)octane
 2,2,6-Trimethyl-4-(1-methylethyl)octane
 2,2,7-Trimethyl-4-(1-methylethyl)octane
 2,3,3-Trimethyl-4-(1-methylethyl)octane
 2,3,4-Trimethyl-4-(1-methylethyl)octane
 2,3,5-Trimethyl-4-(1-methylethyl)octane
 2,3,6-Trimethyl-4-(1-methylethyl)octane
 2,3,7-Trimethyl-4-(1-methylethyl)octane
 2,4,5-Trimethyl-4-(1-methylethyl)octane
 2,4,6-Trimethyl-4-(1-methylethyl)octane
 2,4,7-Trimethyl-4-(1-methylethyl)octane
 2,5,5-Trimethyl-4-(1-methylethyl)octane
 2,5,6-Trimethyl-4-(1-methylethyl)octane
 2,5,7-Trimethyl-4-(1-methylethyl)octane
 2,6,6-Trimethyl-4-(1-methylethyl)octane
 3,3,4-Trimethyl-4-(1-methylethyl)octane
 3,3,5-Trimethyl-4-(1-methylethyl)octane
 3,3,6-Trimethyl-4-(1-methylethyl)octane
 3,4,5-Trimethyl-4-(1-methylethyl)octane
 3,4,6-Trimethyl-4-(1-methylethyl)octane
 3,5,5-Trimethyl-4-(1-methylethyl)octane
 3,5,6-Trimethyl-4-(1-methylethyl)octane
 4,5,5-Trimethyl-4-(1-methylethyl)octane
 2,2,3-Trimethyl-5-(1-methylethyl)octane
 2,2,4-Trimethyl-5-(1-methylethyl)octane
 2,2,5-Trimethyl-5-(1-methylethyl)octane
 2,2,6-Trimethyl-5-(1-methylethyl)octane
 2,2,7-Trimethyl-5-(1-methylethyl)octane
 2,3,3-Trimethyl-5-(1-methylethyl)octane
 2,3,4-Trimethyl-5-(1-methylethyl)octane
 2,3,5-Trimethyl-5-(1-methylethyl)octane
 2,3,6-Trimethyl-5-(1-methylethyl)octane
 2,3,7-Trimethyl-5-(1-methylethyl)octane
 2,4,4-Trimethyl-5-(1-methylethyl)octane
 2,4,5-Trimethyl-5-(1-methylethyl)octane
 2,4,6-Trimethyl-5-(1-methylethyl)octane
 2,5,6-Trimethyl-5-(1-methylethyl)octane
 2,6,6-Trimethyl-5-(1-methylethyl)octane
 3,3,4-Trimethyl-5-(1-methylethyl)octane
 3,3,5-Trimethyl-5-(1-methylethyl)octane
 3,3,6-Trimethyl-5-(1-methylethyl)octane
 3,4,4-Trimethyl-5-(1-methylethyl)octane
 3,4,5-Trimethyl-5-(1-methylethyl)octane
 2,2,7-Trimethyl-6-(1-methylethyl)octane

Ethyl+Methyl+Propyl

 3-Ethyl-2-methyl-4-propyloctane
 3-Ethyl-3-methyl-4-propyloctane
 3-Ethyl-4-methyl-4-propyloctane
 3-Ethyl-5-methyl-4-propyloctane
 3-Ethyl-6-methyl-4-propyloctane
 4-Ethyl-2-methyl-4-propyloctane
 4-Ethyl-3-methyl-4-propyloctane
 4-Ethyl-5-methyl-4-propyloctane
 5-Ethyl-2-methyl-4-propyloctane
 5-Ethyl-3-methyl-4-propyloctane
 5-Ethyl-4-methyl-4-propyloctane
 6-Ethyl-2-methyl-4-propyloctane
 6-Ethyl-3-methyl-4-propyloctane
 3-Ethyl-2-methyl-5-propyloctane
 3-Ethyl-3-methyl-5-propyloctane
 3-Ethyl-4-methyl-5-propyloctane
 3-Ethyl-5-methyl-5-propyloctane
 4-Ethyl-2-methyl-5-propyloctane
 4-Ethyl-3-methyl-5-propyloctane
 4-Ethyl-4-methyl-5-propyloctane
 5-Ethyl-2-methyl-5-propyloctane
 5-Ethyl-3-methyl-5-propyloctane
 6-Ethyl-2-methyl-5-propyloctane
 3-Ethyl-2-methyl-3-(1-methylethyl)octane
 4-Ethyl-2-methyl-3-(1-methylethyl)octane
 5-Ethyl-2-methyl-3-(1-methylethyl)octane
 6-Ethyl-2-methyl-3-(1-methylethyl)octane
 3-Ethyl-2-methyl-4-(1-methylethyl)octane
 3-Ethyl-3-methyl-4-(1-methylethyl)octane
 3-Ethyl-4-methyl-4-(1-methylethyl)octane
 3-Ethyl-5-methyl-4-(1-methylethyl)octane
 3-Ethyl-6-methyl-4-(1-methylethyl)octane
 4-Ethyl-2-methyl-4-(1-methylethyl)octane
 4-Ethyl-3-methyl-4-(1-methylethyl)octane
 4-Ethyl-5-methyl-4-(1-methylethyl)octane
 5-Ethyl-2-methyl-4-(1-methylethyl)octane
 5-Ethyl-3-methyl-4-(1-methylethyl)octane
 5-Ethyl-4-methyl-4-(1-methylethyl)octane
 6-Ethyl-2-methyl-4-(1-methylethyl)octane
 6-Ethyl-3-methyl-4-(1-methylethyl)octane
 3-Ethyl-2-methyl-5-(1-methylethyl)octane
 3-Ethyl-3-methyl-5-(1-methylethyl)octane
 3-Ethyl-4-methyl-5-(1-methylethyl)octane
 3-Ethyl-5-methyl-5-(1-methylethyl)octane
 4-Ethyl-2-methyl-5-(1-methylethyl)octane
 4-Ethyl-3-methyl-5-(1-methylethyl)octane
 4-Ethyl-4-methyl-5-(1-methylethyl)octane
 5-Ethyl-2-methyl-5-(1-methylethyl)octane
 5-Ethyl-3-methyl-5-(1-methylethyl)octane
 6-Ethyl-2-methyl-5-(1-methylethyl)octane

Dipropyl

 4,4-Dipropyloctane
 4,5-Dipropyloctane
 4-(1-Methylethyl)-4-propyloctane
 5-(1-Methylethyl)-4-propyloctane
 4,4-Bis(1-methylethyl)octane
 4,5-Bis(1-methylethyl)octane

Dimethyl+Methylpropyl

 2,2-Dimethyl-4-(1-methylpropyl)octane
 2,3-Dimethyl-4-(1-methylpropyl)octane
 2,4-Dimethyl-4-(1-methylpropyl)octane
 2,5-Dimethyl-4-(1-methylpropyl)octane
 2,6-Dimethyl-4-(1-methylpropyl)octane
 2,7-Dimethyl-4-(1-methylpropyl)octane
 3,3-Dimethyl-4-(1-methylpropyl)octane
 3,4-Dimethyl-4-(1-methylpropyl)octane
 3,5-Dimethyl-4-(1-methylpropyl)octane
 3,6-Dimethyl-4-(1-methylpropyl)octane
 2,6-Dimethyl-5-(1-methylpropyl)octane
 2,2-Dimethyl-4-(2-methylpropyl)octane
 2,3-Dimethyl-4-(2-methylpropyl)octane
 2,4-Dimethyl-4-(2-methylpropyl)octane
 2,5-Dimethyl-4-(2-methylpropyl)octane
 2,6-Dimethyl-4-(2-methylpropyl)octane
 2,7-Dimethyl-4-(2-methylpropyl)octane
 3,3-Dimethyl-4-(2-methylpropyl)octane

Dimethylethyl+Dimethyl

 3-(1,1-Dimethylethyl)-2,2-dimethyloctane
 4-(1,1-Dimethylethyl)-2,2-dimethyloctane
 4-(1,1-Dimethylethyl)-2,3-dimethyloctane
 4-(1,1-Dimethylethyl)-2,4-dimethyloctane
 4-(1,1-Dimethylethyl)-2,5-dimethyloctane
 4-(1,1-Dimethylethyl)-2,6-dimethyloctane
 4-(1,1-Dimethylethyl)-2,7-dimethyloctane
 4-(1,1-Dimethylethyl)-3,3-dimethyloctane
 4-(1,1-Dimethylethyl)-3,4-dimethyloctane
 4-(1,1-Dimethylethyl)-3,5-dimethyloctane
 4-(1,1-Dimethylethyl)-3,6-dimethyloctane
 4-(1,1-Dimethylethyl)-4,5-dimethyloctane
 5-(1,1-Dimethylethyl)-2,2-dimethyloctane
 5-(1,1-Dimethylethyl)-2,3-dimethyloctane
 5-(1,1-Dimethylethyl)-2,4-dimethyloctane
 5-(1,1-Dimethylethyl)-2,5-dimethyloctane
 5-(1,1-Dimethylethyl)-2,6-dimethyloctane
 5-(1,1-Dimethylethyl)-3,3-dimethyloctane
 5-(1,1-Dimethylethyl)-3,4-dimethyloctane
 5-(1,1-Dimethylethyl)-3,5-dimethyloctane
 5-(1,1-Dimethylethyl)-4,4-dimethyloctane

Ethyl+Butyl
 3-Ethyl-4-(1-methylpropyl)octane

Dimethylethyl+Ethyl

 4-(1,1-Dimethylethyl)-3-ethyloctane
 4-(1,1-Dimethylethyl)-4-ethyloctane
 4-(1,1-Dimethylethyl)-5-ethyloctane
 5-(1,1-Dimethylethyl)-3-ethyloctane

Ethylpropyl+Methyl
 4-(1-Ethylpropyl)-2-methyloctane

With heptane backbone

Heptamethyl

 2,2,3,3,4,4,5-Heptamethylheptane
 2,2,3,3,4,4,6-Heptamethylheptane
 2,2,3,3,4,5,5-Heptamethylheptane
 2,2,3,3,4,5,6-Heptamethylheptane
 2,2,3,3,4,6,6-Heptamethylheptane
 2,2,3,3,5,5,6-Heptamethylheptane
 2,2,3,3,5,6,6-Heptamethylheptane
 2,2,3,4,4,5,5-Heptamethylheptane
 2,2,3,4,4,5,6-Heptamethylheptane
 2,2,3,4,4,6,6-Heptamethylheptane
 2,2,3,4,5,5,6-Heptamethylheptane
 2,2,3,4,5,6,6-Heptamethylheptane
 2,2,4,4,5,5,6-Heptamethylheptane
 2,3,3,4,4,5,5-Heptamethylheptane
 2,3,3,4,4,5,6-Heptamethylheptane
 2,3,3,4,5,5,6-Heptamethylheptane

Ethyl+Pentamethyl

 3-Ethyl-2,2,3,4,4-pentamethylheptane
 3-Ethyl-2,2,3,4,5-pentamethylheptane
 3-Ethyl-2,2,3,4,6-pentamethylheptane
 3-Ethyl-2,2,3,5,5-pentamethylheptane
 3-Ethyl-2,2,3,5,6-pentamethylheptane
 3-Ethyl-2,2,3,6,6-pentamethylheptane
 3-Ethyl-2,2,4,4,5-pentamethylheptane
 3-Ethyl-2,2,4,4,6-pentamethylheptane
 3-Ethyl-2,2,4,5,5-pentamethylheptane
 3-Ethyl-2,2,4,5,6-pentamethylheptane
 3-Ethyl-2,2,4,6,6-pentamethylheptane
 3-Ethyl-2,2,5,5,6-pentamethylheptane
 3-Ethyl-2,2,5,6,6-pentamethylheptane
 3-Ethyl-2,3,4,4,5-pentamethylheptane
 3-Ethyl-2,3,4,4,6-pentamethylheptane
 3-Ethyl-2,3,4,5,5-pentamethylheptane
 3-Ethyl-2,3,4,5,6-pentamethylheptane
 3-Ethyl-2,3,5,5,6-pentamethylheptane
 3-Ethyl-2,4,4,5,5-pentamethylheptane
 3-Ethyl-2,4,4,5,6-pentamethylheptane
 3-Ethyl-3,4,4,5,5-pentamethylheptane
 4-Ethyl-2,2,3,3,4-pentamethylheptane
 4-Ethyl-2,2,3,3,5-pentamethylheptane
 4-Ethyl-2,2,3,3,6-pentamethylheptane
 4-Ethyl-2,2,3,4,5-pentamethylheptane
 4-Ethyl-2,2,3,4,6-pentamethylheptane
 4-Ethyl-2,2,3,5,5-pentamethylheptane
 4-Ethyl-2,2,3,5,6-pentamethylheptane
 4-Ethyl-2,2,3,6,6-pentamethylheptane
 4-Ethyl-2,2,4,5,5-pentamethylheptane
 4-Ethyl-2,2,4,5,6-pentamethylheptane
 4-Ethyl-2,2,4,6,6-pentamethylheptane
 4-Ethyl-2,2,5,5,6-pentamethylheptane
 4-Ethyl-2,3,3,4,5-pentamethylheptane
 4-Ethyl-2,3,3,4,6-pentamethylheptane
 4-Ethyl-2,3,3,5,5-pentamethylheptane
 4-Ethyl-2,3,3,5,6-pentamethylheptane
 4-Ethyl-2,3,4,5,5-pentamethylheptane
 4-Ethyl-2,3,4,5,6-pentamethylheptane
 4-Ethyl-3,3,4,5,5-pentamethylheptane
 5-Ethyl-2,2,3,3,4-pentamethylheptane
 5-Ethyl-2,2,3,3,5-pentamethylheptane
 5-Ethyl-2,2,3,3,6-pentamethylheptane
 5-Ethyl-2,2,3,4,4-pentamethylheptane
 5-Ethyl-2,2,3,4,5-pentamethylheptane
 5-Ethyl-2,2,3,4,6-pentamethylheptane
 5-Ethyl-2,2,3,5,6-pentamethylheptane
 5-Ethyl-2,2,4,4,5-pentamethylheptane
 5-Ethyl-2,2,4,4,6-pentamethylheptane
 5-Ethyl-2,2,4,5,6-pentamethylheptane
 5-Ethyl-2,3,3,4,4-pentamethylheptane
 5-Ethyl-2,3,3,4,5-pentamethylheptane
 5-Ethyl-2,3,3,4,6-pentamethylheptane
 5-Ethyl-2,3,4,4,5-pentamethylheptane

Diethyl+Trimethyl

 3,3-Diethyl-2,2,4-trimethylheptane
 3,3-Diethyl-2,2,5-trimethylheptane
 3,3-Diethyl-2,2,6-trimethylheptane
 3,3-Diethyl-2,4,4-trimethylheptane
 3,3-Diethyl-2,4,5-trimethylheptane
 3,3-Diethyl-2,4,6-trimethylheptane
 3,3-Diethyl-2,5,5-trimethylheptane
 3,3-Diethyl-2,5,6-trimethylheptane
 3,3-Diethyl-4,4,5-trimethylheptane
 3,3-Diethyl-4,5,5-trimethylheptane
 3,4-Diethyl-2,2,3-trimethylheptane
 3,4-Diethyl-2,2,4-trimethylheptane
 3,4-Diethyl-2,2,5-trimethylheptane
 3,4-Diethyl-2,2,6-trimethylheptane
 3,4-Diethyl-2,3,4-trimethylheptane
 3,4-Diethyl-2,3,5-trimethylheptane
 3,4-Diethyl-2,3,6-trimethylheptane
 3,4-Diethyl-2,4,5-trimethylheptane
 3,4-Diethyl-2,4,6-trimethylheptane
 3,4-Diethyl-2,5,5-trimethylheptane
 3,4-Diethyl-2,5,6-trimethylheptane
 3,4-Diethyl-3,4,5-trimethylheptane
 3,4-Diethyl-3,5,5-trimethylheptane
 3,5-Diethyl-2,2,3-trimethylheptane
 3,5-Diethyl-2,2,4-trimethylheptane
 3,5-Diethyl-2,2,5-trimethylheptane
 3,5-Diethyl-2,2,6-trimethylheptane
 3,5-Diethyl-2,3,4-trimethylheptane
 3,5-Diethyl-2,3,5-trimethylheptane
 3,5-Diethyl-2,3,6-trimethylheptane
 3,5-Diethyl-2,4,4-trimethylheptane
 3,5-Diethyl-2,4,5-trimethylheptane
 3,5-Diethyl-2,4,6-trimethylheptane
 3,5-Diethyl-3,4,4-trimethylheptane
 3,5-Diethyl-3,4,5-trimethylheptane
 4,4-Diethyl-2,2,3-trimethylheptane
 4,4-Diethyl-2,2,5-trimethylheptane
 4,4-Diethyl-2,2,6-trimethylheptane
 4,4-Diethyl-2,3,3-trimethylheptane
 4,4-Diethyl-2,3,5-trimethylheptane
 4,4-Diethyl-2,3,6-trimethylheptane
 4,4-Diethyl-2,5,5-trimethylheptane
 4,4-Diethyl-3,3,5-trimethylheptane
 4,5-Diethyl-2,2,3-trimethylheptane
 4,5-Diethyl-2,2,4-trimethylheptane
 4,5-Diethyl-2,2,5-trimethylheptane
 4,5-Diethyl-2,2,6-trimethylheptane
 4,5-Diethyl-2,3,3-trimethylheptane
 4,5-Diethyl-2,3,4-trimethylheptane
 4,5-Diethyl-2,3,5-trimethylheptane
 4,5-Diethyl-2,4,5-trimethylheptane
 4,5-Diethyl-3,3,4-trimethylheptane
 5,5-Diethyl-2,2,3-trimethylheptane
 5,5-Diethyl-2,2,4-trimethylheptane
 5,5-Diethyl-2,2,6-trimethylheptane
 5,5-Diethyl-2,3,3-trimethylheptane
 5,5-Diethyl-2,3,4-trimethylheptane
 5,5-Diethyl-2,4,4-trimethylheptane

Triethyl+Methyl

 3,3,4-Triethyl-2-methylheptane
 3,3,4-Triethyl-4-methylheptane
 3,3,4-Triethyl-5-methylheptane
 3,3,5-Triethyl-2-methylheptane
 3,3,5-Triethyl-4-methylheptane
 3,3,5-Triethyl-5-methylheptane
 3,4,4-Triethyl-2-methylheptane
 3,4,4-Triethyl-3-methylheptane
 3,4,4-Triethyl-5-methylheptane
 3,4,5-Triethyl-2-methylheptane
 3,4,5-Triethyl-3-methylheptane
 3,4,5-Triethyl-4-methylheptane
 3,5,5-Triethyl-2-methylheptane
 4,4,5-Triethyl-2-methylheptane
 4,5,5-Triethyl-2-methylheptane

Tetramethyl+Propyl

 2,2,3,3-Tetramethyl-4-propylheptane
 2,2,3,4-Tetramethyl-4-propylheptane
 2,2,3,5-Tetramethyl-4-propylheptane
 2,2,3,6-Tetramethyl-4-propylheptane
 2,2,4,5-Tetramethyl-4-propylheptane
 2,2,4,6-Tetramethyl-4-propylheptane
 2,2,5,5-Tetramethyl-4-propylheptane
 2,2,5,6-Tetramethyl-4-propylheptane
 2,2,6,6-Tetramethyl-4-propylheptane
 2,3,3,4-Tetramethyl-4-propylheptane
 2,3,3,5-Tetramethyl-4-propylheptane
 2,3,3,6-Tetramethyl-4-propylheptane
 2,3,4,5-Tetramethyl-4-propylheptane
 2,3,4,6-Tetramethyl-4-propylheptane
 2,3,5,5-Tetramethyl-4-propylheptane
 2,3,5,6-Tetramethyl-4-propylheptane
 2,4,5,5-Tetramethyl-4-propylheptane
 3,3,4,5-Tetramethyl-4-propylheptane
 3,3,5,5-Tetramethyl-4-propylheptane
 2,2,3,4-Tetramethyl-3-(1-methylethyl)heptane
 2,2,3,5-Tetramethyl-3-(1-methylethyl)heptane
 2,2,3,6-Tetramethyl-3-(1-methylethyl)heptane
 2,2,4,4-Tetramethyl-3-(1-methylethyl)heptane
 2,2,4,5-Tetramethyl-3-(1-methylethyl)heptane
 2,2,4,6-Tetramethyl-3-(1-methylethyl)heptane
 2,2,5,5-Tetramethyl-3-(1-methylethyl)heptane
 2,2,5,6-Tetramethyl-3-(1-methylethyl)heptane
 2,2,6,6-Tetramethyl-3-(1-methylethyl)heptane
 2,3,4,4-Tetramethyl-3-(1-methylethyl)heptane
 2,3,4,5-Tetramethyl-3-(1-methylethyl)heptane
 2,3,4,6-Tetramethyl-3-(1-methylethyl)heptane
 2,3,5,5-Tetramethyl-3-(1-methylethyl)heptane
 2,3,5,6-Tetramethyl-3-(1-methylethyl)heptane
 2,4,4,5-Tetramethyl-3-(1-methylethyl)heptane
 2,4,4,6-Tetramethyl-3-(1-methylethyl)heptane
 2,4,5,5-Tetramethyl-3-(1-methylethyl)heptane
 2,4,5,6-Tetramethyl-3-(1-methylethyl)heptane
 2,2,3,3-Tetramethyl-4-(1-methylethyl)heptane
 2,2,3,4-Tetramethyl-4-(1-methylethyl)heptane
 2,2,3,5-Tetramethyl-4-(1-methylethyl)heptane
 2,2,3,6-Tetramethyl-4-(1-methylethyl)heptane
 2,2,4,5-Tetramethyl-4-(1-methylethyl)heptane
 2,2,4,6-Tetramethyl-4-(1-methylethyl)heptane
 2,2,5,5-Tetramethyl-4-(1-methylethyl)heptane
 2,2,5,6-Tetramethyl-4-(1-methylethyl)heptane
 2,2,6,6-Tetramethyl-4-(1-methylethyl)heptane
 2,3,3,4-Tetramethyl-4-(1-methylethyl)heptane
 2,3,3,5-Tetramethyl-4-(1-methylethyl)heptane
 2,3,3,6-Tetramethyl-4-(1-methylethyl)heptane
 2,3,4,5-Tetramethyl-4-(1-methylethyl)heptane
 2,3,4,6-Tetramethyl-4-(1-methylethyl)heptane
 2,3,5,5-Tetramethyl-4-(1-methylethyl)heptane
 2,3,5,6-Tetramethyl-4-(1-methylethyl)heptane
 2,4,5,5-Tetramethyl-4-(1-methylethyl)heptane
 3,3,4,5-Tetramethyl-4-(1-methylethyl)heptane
 3,3,5,5-Tetramethyl-4-(1-methylethyl)heptane
 2,2,3,6-Tetramethyl-5-(1-methylethyl)heptane
 2,2,4,6-Tetramethyl-5-(1-methylethyl)heptane
 2,2,5,6-Tetramethyl-5-(1-methylethyl)heptane
 2,3,3,6-Tetramethyl-5-(1-methylethyl)heptane

Ethyl+Dimethyl+Propyl

 3-Ethyl-2,2-dimethyl-4-propylheptane
 3-Ethyl-2,3-dimethyl-4-propylheptane
 3-Ethyl-2,4-dimethyl-4-propylheptane
 3-Ethyl-2,5-dimethyl-4-propylheptane
 3-Ethyl-2,6-dimethyl-4-propylheptane
 3-Ethyl-3,4-dimethyl-4-propylheptane
 3-Ethyl-3,5-dimethyl-4-propylheptane
 3-Ethyl-4,5-dimethyl-4-propylheptane
 4-Ethyl-2,2-dimethyl-4-propylheptane
 4-Ethyl-2,3-dimethyl-4-propylheptane
 4-Ethyl-2,5-dimethyl-4-propylheptane
 4-Ethyl-2,6-dimethyl-4-propylheptane
 4-Ethyl-3,3-dimethyl-4-propylheptane
 4-Ethyl-3,5-dimethyl-4-propylheptane
 5-Ethyl-2,2-dimethyl-4-propylheptane
 5-Ethyl-2,3-dimethyl-4-propylheptane
 5-Ethyl-2,4-dimethyl-4-propylheptane
 5-Ethyl-2,5-dimethyl-4-propylheptane
 5-Ethyl-3,3-dimethyl-4-propylheptane
 3-Ethyl-2,2-dimethyl-3-(1-methylethyl)heptane
 3-Ethyl-2,4-dimethyl-3-(1-methylethyl)heptane
 3-Ethyl-2,5-dimethyl-3-(1-methylethyl)heptane
 3-Ethyl-2,6-dimethyl-3-(1-methylethyl)heptane
 4-Ethyl-2,2-dimethyl-3-(1-methylethyl)heptane
 4-Ethyl-2,3-dimethyl-3-(1-methylethyl)heptane
 4-Ethyl-2,4-dimethyl-3-(1-methylethyl)heptane
 4-Ethyl-2,5-dimethyl-3-(1-methylethyl)heptane
 4-Ethyl-2,6-dimethyl-3-(1-methylethyl)heptane
 5-Ethyl-2,2-dimethyl-3-(1-methylethyl)heptane
 5-Ethyl-2,3-dimethyl-3-(1-methylethyl)heptane
 5-Ethyl-2,4-dimethyl-3-(1-methylethyl)heptane
 5-Ethyl-2,5-dimethyl-3-(1-methylethyl)heptane
 5-Ethyl-2,6-dimethyl-3-(1-methylethyl)heptane
 3-Ethyl-2,2-dimethyl-4-(1-methylethyl)heptane
 3-Ethyl-2,3-dimethyl-4-(1-methylethyl)heptane
 3-Ethyl-2,4-dimethyl-4-(1-methylethyl)heptane
 3-Ethyl-2,5-dimethyl-4-(1-methylethyl)heptane
 3-Ethyl-2,6-dimethyl-4-(1-methylethyl)heptane
 3-Ethyl-3,4-dimethyl-4-(1-methylethyl)heptane
 3-Ethyl-3,5-dimethyl-4-(1-methylethyl)heptane
 3-Ethyl-4,5-dimethyl-4-(1-methylethyl)heptane
 4-Ethyl-2,2-dimethyl-4-(1-methylethyl)heptane
 4-Ethyl-2,3-dimethyl-4-(1-methylethyl)heptane
 4-Ethyl-2,5-dimethyl-4-(1-methylethyl)heptane
 4-Ethyl-2,6-dimethyl-4-(1-methylethyl)heptane
 4-Ethyl-3,3-dimethyl-4-(1-methylethyl)heptane
 4-Ethyl-3,5-dimethyl-4-(1-methylethyl)heptane
 5-Ethyl-2,2-dimethyl-4-(1-methylethyl)heptane
 5-Ethyl-2,3-dimethyl-4-(1-methylethyl)heptane
 5-Ethyl-2,4-dimethyl-4-(1-methylethyl)heptane
 5-Ethyl-2,5-dimethyl-4-(1-methylethyl)heptane
 5-Ethyl-3,3-dimethyl-4-(1-methylethyl)heptane

Diethyl+Propyl

 3,3-Diethyl-4-propylheptane
 3,4-Diethyl-4-propylheptane
 3,5-Diethyl-4-propylheptane
 3,3-Diethyl-4-(1-methylethyl)heptane
 3,4-Diethyl-4-(1-methylethyl)heptane
 3,5-Diethyl-4-(1-methylethyl)heptane

Methyl+Dipropyl

 2-Methyl-4,4-dipropylheptane
 3-Methyl-4,4-dipropylheptane
 2-Methyl-3-(1-methylethyl)-4-propylheptane
 2-Methyl-4-(1-methylethyl)-4-propylheptane
 3-Methyl-4-(1-methylethyl)-4-propylheptane
 2-Methyl-3,3-bis(1-methylethyl)heptane
 2-Methyl-3,4-bis(1-methylethyl)heptane
 2-Methyl-4,4-bis(1-methylethyl)heptane
 3-Methyl-4,4-bis(1-methylethyl)heptane

Butyl+Trimethyl

 2,2,5-Trimethyl-4-(1-methylpropyl)heptane
 2,3,5-Trimethyl-4-(1-methylpropyl)heptane
 2,4,5-Trimethyl-4-(1-methylpropyl)heptane
 2,5,5-Trimethyl-4-(1-methylpropyl)heptane
 3,3,5-Trimethyl-4-(1-methylpropyl)heptane
 3,4,5-Trimethyl-4-(1-methylpropyl)heptane
 2,2,5-Trimethyl-4-(2-methylpropyl)heptane
 2,2,6-Trimethyl-4-(2-methylpropyl)heptane
 2,3,5-Trimethyl-4-(2-methylpropyl)heptane
 2,3,6-Trimethyl-4-(2-methylpropyl)heptane
 2,4,5-Trimethyl-4-(2-methylpropyl)heptane
 2,4,6-Trimethyl-4-(2-methylpropyl)heptane
 2,5,5-Trimethyl-4-(2-methylpropyl)heptane
 3-(1,1-Dimethylethyl)-2,2,3-trimethylheptane
 3-(1,1-Dimethylethyl)-2,2,4-trimethylheptane
 3-(1,1-Dimethylethyl)-2,2,5-trimethylheptane
 3-(1,1-Dimethylethyl)-2,2,6-trimethylheptane
 4-(1,1-Dimethylethyl)-2,2,3-trimethylheptane
 4-(1,1-Dimethylethyl)-2,2,4-trimethylheptane
 4-(1,1-Dimethylethyl)-2,2,5-trimethylheptane
 4-(1,1-Dimethylethyl)-2,2,6-trimethylheptane
 4-(1,1-Dimethylethyl)-2,3,3-trimethylheptane
 4-(1,1-Dimethylethyl)-2,3,4-trimethylheptane
 4-(1,1-Dimethylethyl)-2,3,5-trimethylheptane
 4-(1,1-Dimethylethyl)-2,3,6-trimethylheptane
 4-(1,1-Dimethylethyl)-2,4,5-trimethylheptane
 4-(1,1-Dimethylethyl)-2,4,6-trimethylheptane
 4-(1,1-Dimethylethyl)-2,5,5-trimethylheptane
 4-(1,1-Dimethylethyl)-3,3,4-trimethylheptane
 4-(1,1-Dimethylethyl)-3,3,5-trimethylheptane
 4-(1,1-Dimethylethyl)-3,4,5-trimethylheptane

Ethyl+Methyl+Propyl
 3-Ethyl-5-methyl-4-(1-methylpropyl)heptane
 5-Ethyl-2-methyl-4-(1-methylpropyl)heptane
 5-Ethyl-2-methyl-4-(2-methylpropyl)heptane

Butyl+Ethyl+Methyl

 4-(1,1-Dimethylethyl)-3-ethyl-2-methylheptane
 4-(1,1-Dimethylethyl)-3-ethyl-3-methylheptane
 4-(1,1-Dimethylethyl)-3-ethyl-4-methylheptane
 4-(1,1-Dimethylethyl)-3-ethyl-5-methylheptane
 4-(1,1-Dimethylethyl)-4-ethyl-2-methylheptane
 4-(1,1-Dimethylethyl)-4-ethyl-3-methylheptane
 4-(1,1-Dimethylethyl)-5-ethyl-2-methylheptane

Butyl+Propyl
 4-(1,1-Dimethylethyl)-4-propylheptane
 4-(1,1-Dimethylethyl)-4-(1-methylethyl)heptane

With hexane backbone

Octamethyl
 2,2,3,3,4,4,5,5-octamethylhexane

Ethyl+Hexamethyl

 3-Ethyl-2,2,3,4,4,5-hexamethylhexane
 3-Ethyl-2,2,3,4,5,5-hexamethylhexane
 4-Ethyl-2,2,3,3,4,5-hexamethylhexane
 4-Ethyl-2,2,3,3,5,5-hexamethylhexane

Diethyl+Tetramethyl

 3,3-Diethyl-2,2,4,4-tetramethylhexane
 3,3-Diethyl-2,2,4,5-tetramethylhexane
 3,3-Diethyl-2,2,5,5-tetramethylhexane
 3,3-Diethyl-2,4,4,5-tetramethylhexane
 3,4-Diethyl-2,2,3,4-tetramethylhexane
 3,4-Diethyl-2,2,3,5-tetramethylhexane
 3,4-Diethyl-2,2,4,5-tetramethylhexane
 3,4-Diethyl-2,2,5,5-tetramethylhexane
 3,4-Diethyl-2,3,4,5-tetramethylhexane
 4,4-Diethyl-2,2,3,3-tetramethylhexane
 4,4-Diethyl-2,2,3,5-tetramethylhexane

Triethyl+Dimethyl

 3,3,4-Triethyl-2,2-dimethylhexane
 3,3,4-Triethyl-2,4-dimethylhexane
 3,3,4-Triethyl-2,5-dimethylhexane
 3,4,4-Triethyl-2,2-dimethylhexane
 3,4,4-Triethyl-2,3-dimethylhexane

Tetraethyl
 3,3,4,4-Tetraethylhexane

Pentamethyl+Propyl

 2,2,3,4,4-Pentamethyl-3-(1-methylethyl)hexane
 2,2,3,4,5-Pentamethyl-3-(1-methylethyl)hexane
 2,2,3,5,5-Pentamethyl-3-(1-methylethyl)hexane
 2,2,4,4,5-Pentamethyl-3-(1-methylethyl)hexane
 2,2,4,5,5-Pentamethyl-3-(1-methylethyl)hexane
 2,3,4,4,5-Pentamethyl-3-(1-methylethyl)hexane
 2,2,3,3,5-Pentamethyl-4-(1-methylethyl)hexane
 2,2,3,4,5-Pentamethyl-4-(1-methylethyl)hexane

Ethyl+Trimethyl+Propyl

 3-Ethyl-2,2,4-trimethyl-3-(1-methylethyl)hexane
 3-Ethyl-2,2,5-trimethyl-3-(1-methylethyl)hexane
 3-Ethyl-2,4,4-trimethyl-3-(1-methylethyl)hexane
 3-Ethyl-2,4,5-trimethyl-3-(1-methylethyl)hexane
 4-Ethyl-2,2,3-trimethyl-3-(1-methylethyl)hexane
 4-Ethyl-2,2,4-trimethyl-3-(1-methylethyl)hexane
 4-Ethyl-2,2,5-trimethyl-3-(1-methylethyl)hexane
 4-Ethyl-2,3,4-trimethyl-3-(1-methylethyl)hexane
 4-Ethyl-2,3,5-trimethyl-3-(1-methylethyl)hexane
 3-Ethyl-2,2,5-trimethyl-4-(1-methylethyl)hexane
 3-Ethyl-2,3,5-trimethyl-4-(1-methylethyl)hexane
 4-Ethyl-2,2,5-trimethyl-4-(1-methylethyl)hexane

Diethyl+Methyl+Propyl
 3,4-Diethyl-2-methyl-3-(1-methylethyl)hexane
 4,4-Diethyl-2-methyl-3-(1-methylethyl)hexane

Dimethyl+Dipropyl

 2,2-Dimethyl-3,3-bis(1-methylethyl)hexane
 2,4-Dimethyl-3,3-bis(1-methylethyl)hexane
 2,5-Dimethyl-3,3-bis(1-methylethyl)hexane
 2,5-Dimethyl-3,4-bis(1-methylethyl)hexane

tert-Butyl+Tetramethyl

 3-(1,1-Dimethylethyl)-2,2,3,4-tetramethylhexane
 3-(1,1-Dimethylethyl)-2,2,3,5-tetramethylhexane
 3-(1,1-Dimethylethyl)-2,2,4,4-tetramethylhexane
 3-(1,1-Dimethylethyl)-2,2,4,5-tetramethylhexane
 3-(1,1-Dimethylethyl)-2,2,5,5-tetramethylhexane

tert-Butyl+Ethyl+Dimethyl
 3-(1,1-Dimethylethyl)-3-ethyl-2,2-dimethylhexane
 3-(1,1-Dimethylethyl)-4-ethyl-2,2-dimethylhexane

With pentane backbone
 3-Ethyl-2,2,4,4-tetramethyl-3-(1-methylethyl)pentane
 2,2,4-Trimethyl-3,3-bis(1-methylethyl)pentane
 3-(1,1-Dimethylethyl)-2,2,3,4,4-pentamethylpentane

References 

Lists of isomers of alkanes
Isomerism
Hydrocarbons